= Contemporary European law =

Overview of the history of European law

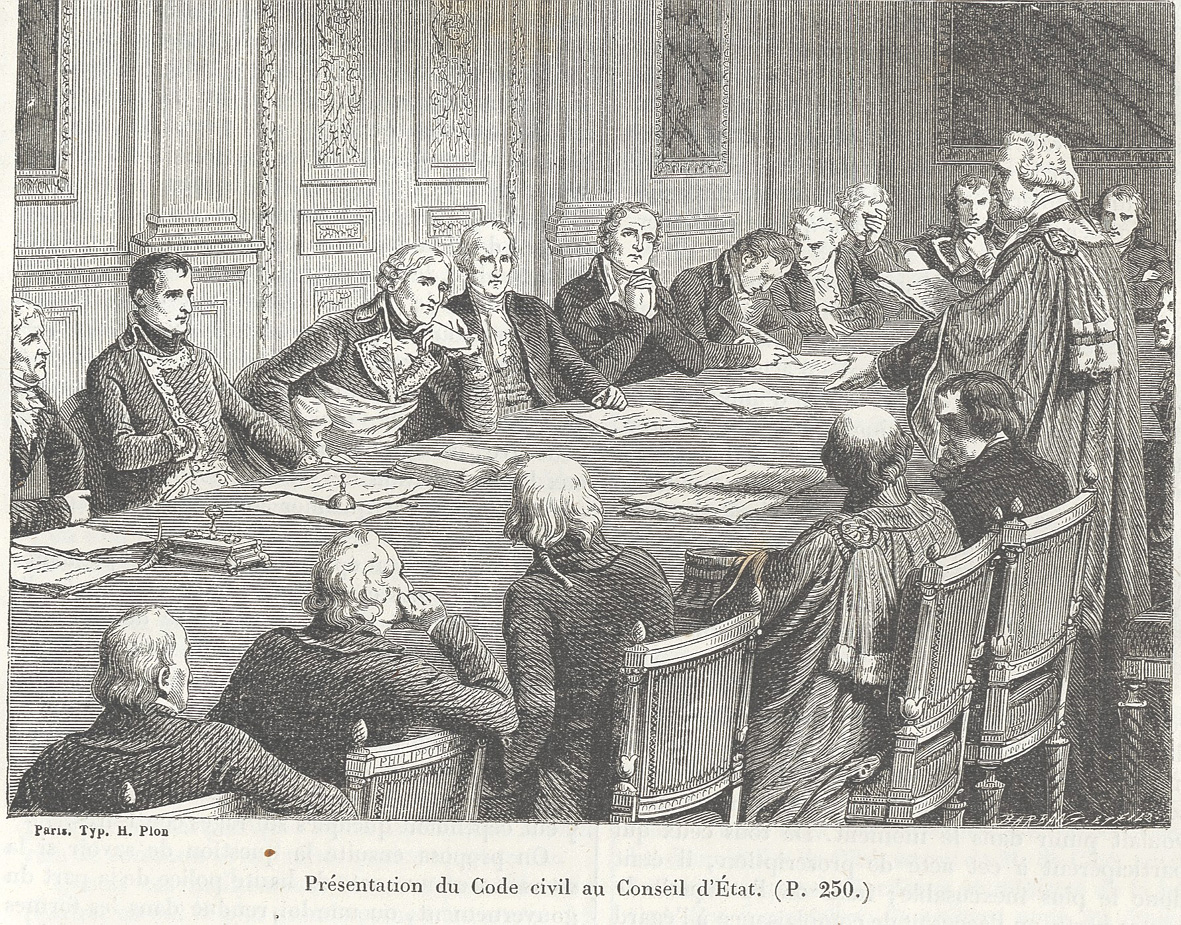
Presentation of the French Civil Code to the Council of State. The Napoleonic Code, enacted in 1804, marked a pivotal shift from early modern law to contemporary law. Embracing liberalism, it repealed all prior legal sources, profoundly influencing subsequent legal systems not only in continental Europe but across much of the world.

Contemporary European law refers to the development of European legal systems from the late 18th century to the present day. The Napoleonic era, known for the Napoleonic Wars, is also notable for the French Civil Code of 1804, a landmark in legal history. This code replaced the fragmented system of customary law and redefined jurists as interpreters of codified statutes. The idea of codification spread across Europe, encountering both support and opposition. The concept of codification spread across Europe, generating both support and resistance. A major codification debate arose, led by Friedrich Carl von Savigny, whose opposition laid the groundwork for the German historical school and introduced the concept of the "juristic act". Despite resistance, the German Empire adopted the Bürgerliches Gesetzbuch in 1900, largely shaped by Pandectist jurists.

The social changes of the 19th century influenced legal evolution, particularly with the rise of labor law in the early 20th century. Technological progress from the Industrial Revolution supported the rise of legal positivism, which promoted a scientific approach centered on legal norms. This gave rise to normativism, championed by Hans Kelsen. Positivism faced opposition from various schools, including neo-Kantian and neo-Hegelian natural law theories, the institutionalism of Santi Romano and Maurice Hauriou, and Rudolf von Jhering's jurisprudence of interests.

The first half of the 20th century saw totalitarian regimes using law as a direct instrument of power, often with devastating effects. In contrast, the post-World War II period, termed by Norberto Bobbio as the "age of rights", emphasized the inviolability of fundamental human rights. New constitutions reflected this shift, expanding rights to include health, opinion, social security, suffrage, equality, labor, and environmental and animal protections. From the 1960s, family law underwent major reforms, especially in recognizing women's legal status. Globalization challenged the traditional state-based legal order, spreading commercial contract models—often of American origin—and increasing the influence of supranational organizations. Rapid advances in information technology, medicine, and biotechnology introduced ethical issues that law continues to address.

== Historical and legal context in early 19th-century Europe ==
At the end of the 18th century, Europe still operated under the system of ius commune, a body of medieval law rooted in Roman law as transmitted through Justinian's Corpus Juris Civilis. Throughout the modern era, this system was accompanied by a multitude of other legal sources, including commentaries, collections of consilia, treatises, legal opinions, and compendia, alongside royal legislation. The cumulative effect of these disparate sources resulted in a substantial unpredictability in judicial decisions, contributing to frequent injustices and inequalities within the Ancien Régime—a world still divided by class and governed by absolute monarchs. By the 18th century, many thinkers—particularly the Enlightenment philosophers—had highlighted the flaws in this system, proposing reforms that some rulers, in a spirit of enlightened absolutism, attempted to implement. However, the French Revolution outbreak in 1789 marked a definitive break with the past, bringing about sweeping reforms to France's legal order. These reforms, though later adapted to local contexts, eventually spread across continental Europe, marking the beginning of contemporary legal history.

== Early 19th century: the beginning of codifications ==
The legal uncertainty prevailing in early 19th-century Europe prompted some states to embrace codification—the drafting of a comprehensive legal code that would gather and systematize all the rules governing a specific branch of law while rejecting supplementation by external sources. The pioneer of this legal transformation was the civil code commissioned by Napoleon Bonaparte, which stemmed directly from the French Revolution (1789–1799).

=== Napoleonic code ===
==== Origins ====
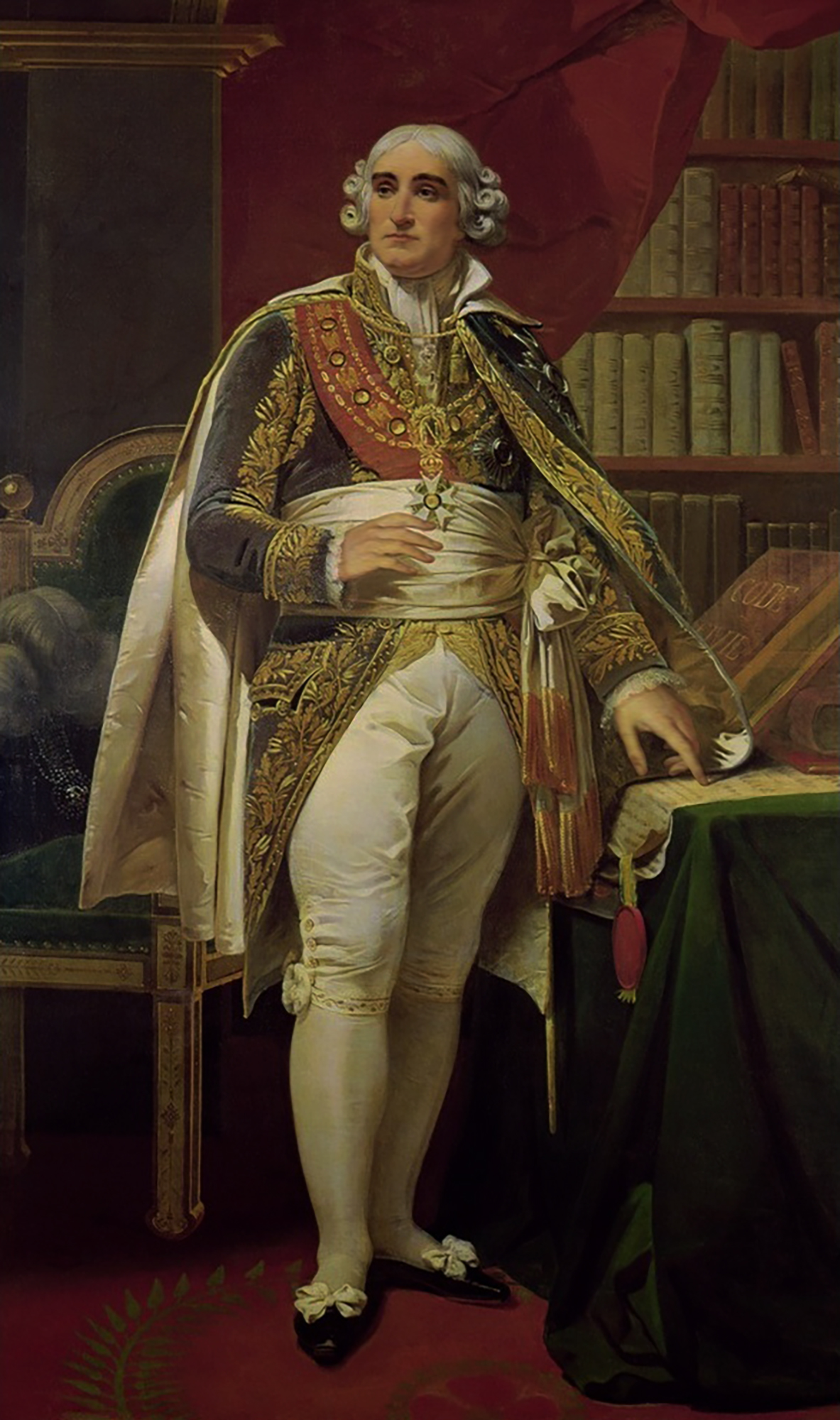
French jurist Jean-Jacques Régis de Cambacérès

By the late 18th century, legal uncertainty was particularly acute in France. As Voltaire remarked, "A traveler in this country changes laws almost as often as he changes horses." (Note: "Un homme qui voyage dans ce pays change de loi presque autant de fois qu'il change de chevaux de poste" (in French) – Voltaire, Coutumes) Even the legal principles varied, with southern France following written ius commune, while the north still operated under customary law dating back to the Carolingian dynasty.

Despite widespread awareness of the issue, it was the French Revolution that ultimately dismantled the old legal structure, advocating for a "general code of simple and clear laws." The drafting process, however, was fraught with difficulty. Between 1793 and 1796, Jean-Jacques Régis de Cambacérès produced three draft codes, all of which were rejected for being either too vague, too casuistic, or overly technical. The first two drafts, developed during the Reign of Terror, contained the most radical innovations of the Revolution—easy divorce, equal inheritance rights for legitimate and natural children, expanded testamentary freedom, absolute conceptions of property, and the abolition of paternal authority and marital authority. These provisions were moderated in the third draft, produced after Robespierre's fall.

Other proposals followed, including a 1798 draft by Jean-Ignace Jacqueminot that limited revolutionary radicalism. Although it too was rejected, it showed that a workable compromise was close. A new commission, composed of four respected and moderate jurists—most notably Jean-Étienne-Marie Portalis, author of the "Preliminary Discourse to the Civil Code"—was officially appointed on 12 August 1800. A first draft was presented in 1801 to the Council of State, which approved it after more than 100 sessions. Napoleon Bonaparte personally participated in many of these, especially those dealing with socially significant issues like divorce. The resulting "French Civil Code", soon known as the "Napoleonic Code", came into force on 21 March 1804.

==== Content and significance ====
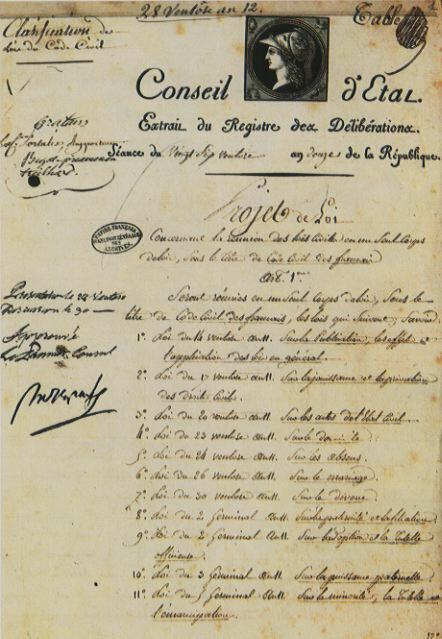
Act of promulgation of the French Civil Code, dated 19 March 1804

The enactment of the Napoleonic Code marked a turning point in the history of law, severing ties with centuries of legal tradition. The accompanying law of promulgation abolished all previously applicable normative sources, including Roman law, ordinances, judicial precedents, and customary rules. (Note: The famous repealing regulation is the Law of 30 Windy Year XII, which reads: "From the day on which the laws making up the code come into force, Roman laws, ordinances, general or local customs, statutes and regulations cease to have the force of general or specific law in matters covered by the said laws". Although adding that this is limited to "matières qui sont l'objet desdites lois.") Judges were prohibited from appealing to equity, natural law, or custom in cases of legal lacunae—a scenario anticipated by the drafters themselves, (Note: As can be seen from the preliminary books of Portalis, who believed that the code, although comprehensive, could not prevent unforeseen cases from coming before the court) thereby excluding the supplementation of the code by other sources. Thus, the Civil Code became the sole source of French law. Article 4 further mandated that no judge could refuse to issue a ruling "on the grounds of silence, obscurity, or insufficiency of the law."

The Napoleonic Code consisted of a total of 2281 articles divided into a preliminary title (articles 1 to 6) and three books: On Persons (articles 7 to 515), On Property and the Different Modifications of Ownership (articles 516 to 710), and On the Different Ways of Acquiring Ownership (articles 711 to 2,281). Many have noted and praised the simple, elegant, and concise language in which the provisions are written, so much so that it served as an inspiration for some writers of the time: in a letter sent to Honoré de Balzac, Stendhal wrote that he used to read it as a model of style.

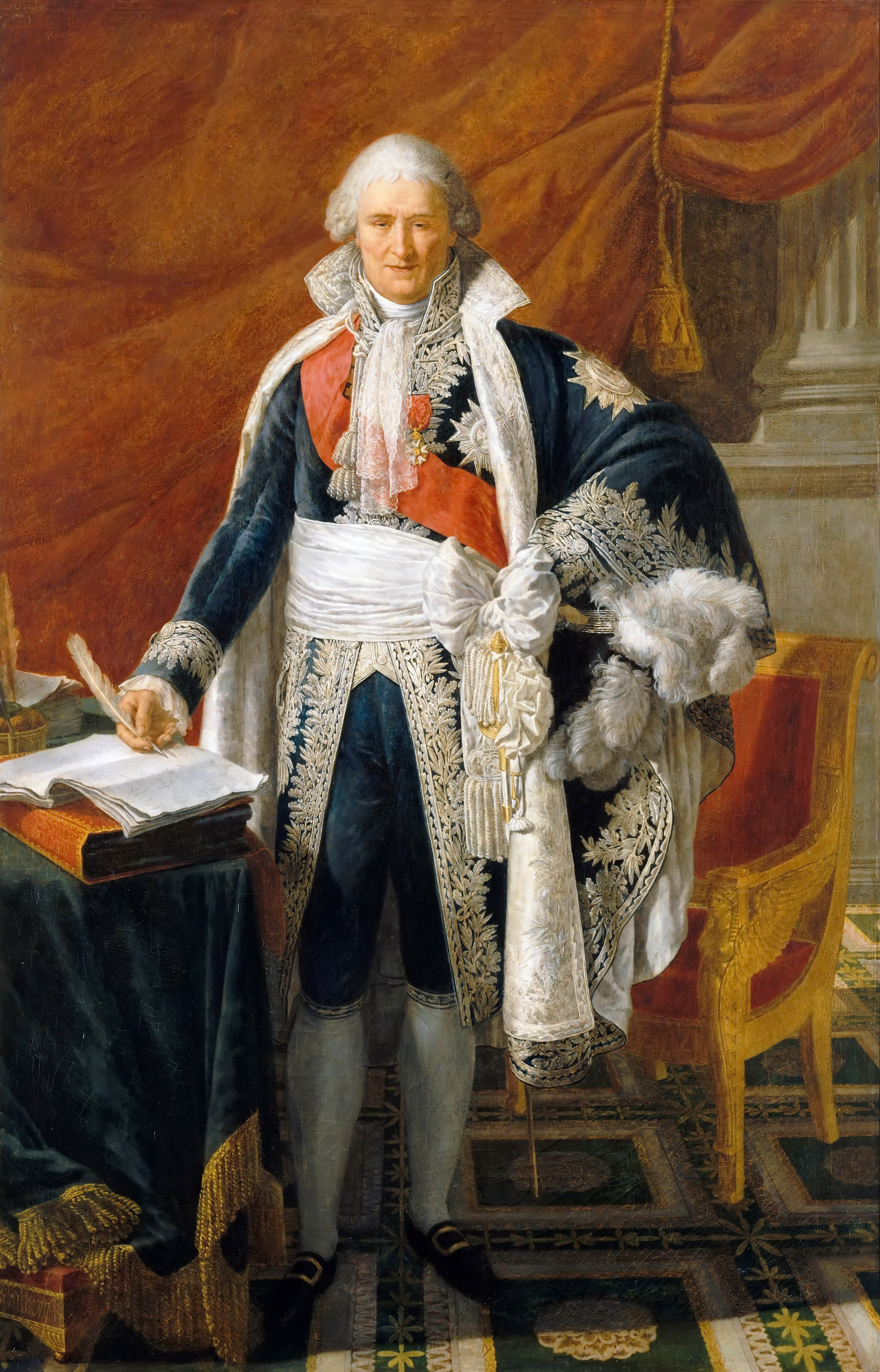
Jean-Étienne-Marie Portalis, principal author of the French Civil Code

On social matters, the code attempted to balance revolutionary reform with tradition. Marriage was defined as a civil contract and civil registries were introduced. Full authority over the wife and children was restored to the husband, who managed family property and retained paternal authority until the children's majority. Divorce was retained but more narrowly defined: for example, a wife's adultery qualified, while a husband's only did if he brought a concubine into the home.

The greatest break with the past is evident in the second book, which is centered on the legal concept of "property" and considered one of the key elements, if not the cornerstone, of the entire code. According to Article 544, "property is the right to enjoy and dispose of things in the most absolute manner, provided that no use is made of them that is prohibited by laws or regulations", overcoming the medieval legal tradition in which different subjects could hold different rights over the same asset. Everyone was given the possibility, at least in theory, to buy and sell any asset, and this occurred solely through the consent of the parties, no longer requiring the traditio used in Roman law; Article 1108 outlines the requirements of a contract: consent, capacity to contract, an object, and a lawful cause. The entire code, moreover, revolves around the abstract and unified figure, born during the revolution, of the "citizen", who is the sole subject of egalitarian law in the field of private law (no longer the noble, the bourgeois, or the cleric).

The Napoleonic Code not only transformed France—it ushered in a "radical transformation of the legal order throughout continental Europe." Its influence spread both voluntarily and "at the point of a bayonet" to territories under the First French Empire, shaping the legal systems not only of Europe but of many parts of the world. It established what became the legal model of the 19th and 20th centuries.

==== Other Napoleonic codes ====
In the years following the Civil Code, Napoleon introduced additional codes covering other branches of law, aiming to "eliminate the uncertainties and arbitrariness of the Ancien Régime". These included the Code of Civil Procedure, the Code of Criminal Procedure, the Penal Code, and the Commercial Code.

The Commercial Code became necessary because the Civil Code had been designed for the "ordinary citizen"—someone who did not engage in speculation and bought goods solely for personal or family use, reflecting a society still largely based on agriculture. To regulate the emerging bourgeois and capitalist world, a separate code was created to govern commercial matters. Disputes in this area were still resolved in special courts—more accessible and faster—presided over by merchants themselves. However, commercial law in the Napoleonic codification remained underdeveloped and secondary to civil law due to the country's ongoing struggle to overcome its backwardness.

=== Austrian code (ABGB) ===
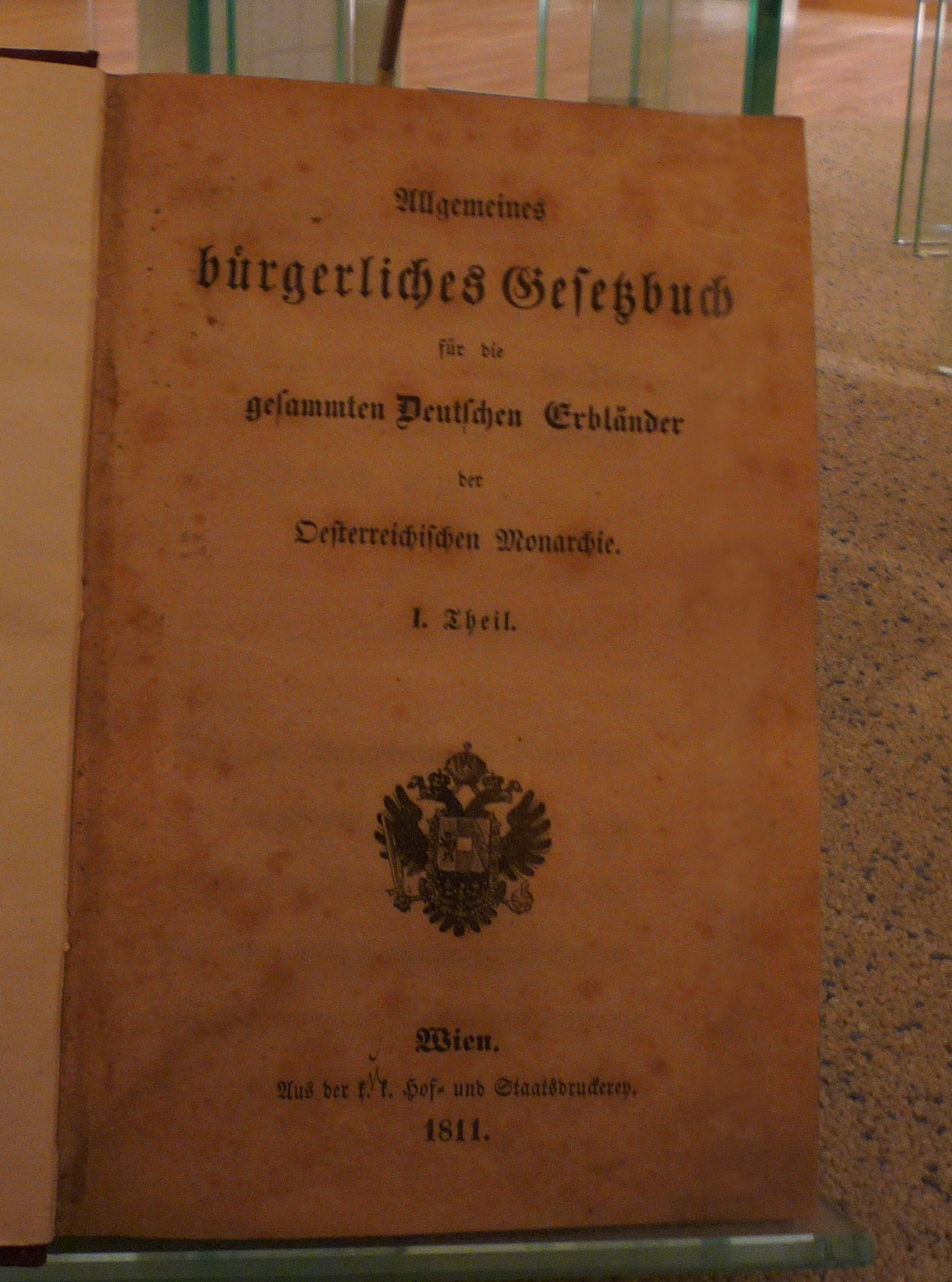
Title page of the Allgemeines Bürgerliches Gesetzbuch (ABGB) of 1811

Empress Maria Theresa of Austria's ambition to provide the Habsburg domains with a civil code, which had failed with the never-promulgated Codex Theresianus of 1766, was ultimately realized half a century later with the Austrian Civil Code of 1811. It entered into force on 1 January 1812 to make justice more manageable and consistent across a realm whose populations had previously been governed by diverse legal systems. The task of unifying the laws into a single text was initially given to a commission headed by the Italian jurist Carlo Antonio Martini, who presented a draft in 1796 that faced widespread criticism. The initiative was later taken up by Franz von Zeiller, Martini's student, who revised and improved upon his teacher's work, eventually leading to the final approval of the Allgemeines bürgerliches Gesetzbuch (ABGB). The code comprised 1,502 articles, divided into three books—persons, property, and actions—following the traditional structure of Gaius's Institutes... It was the first Austrian code that could not be supplemented by external sources, as it was intended both to reorganize existing law and to expressly repeal all conflicting legal sources then in force.

The ABGB dealt exclusively with private law. Regarding marriage, after lengthy debate and unlike in France, it was defined as a religious sacrament, and thus deemed irrevocable and indissoluble. For the same reason, marriages between Christians and non-Christians were prohibited. Married women were allowed to manage their paraphernal property freely without their husband's authorization. The provisions on property were less innovative, still reflecting the Roman law distinction—later adopted in medieval law—between usufruct and direct ownership. The institution of fideicommissum (entail) also remained in effect, albeit with some limitations compared to the past. Stylistically, the code's language was less prescriptive than that of the Napoleonic Code, allowing for greater judicial discretion and a partial openness to natural law. Legal historians have nonetheless emphasized how the third part of the code appears quite modern, especially in its treatment of the "modification and extinction of legal relationships", anticipating 19th-century doctrinal developments in the legal transaction.

=== Consequences: the school of exegesis ===
The codes were designed to eliminate uncertainties and possibilities for arbitrary manipulation of the law. According to the theory of legal positivism, an "absolute primacy of the law was finally established, reducing law to nothing but the law": the legislator was the sole and undisputed source of law, and the code was its expression. For this reason, the code had to be capable of regulating any situation through general and abstract norms without presenting contradictions or gaps. Within the code, the jurist would find the solution to all problems. The reduction of law to mere legislation had consequences for judges, who were transformed into "mere executors of norms without the possibility of interpretation", tasked solely with applying the code literally according to the expressed will of the legislator. This work of simple exegesis of the code coincided with the rise of a new method of legal study, which came to be known as the school of exegesis. The jurists of this school, which gained prominence throughout the 19th century in much of Europe, were thus trained exclusively on the content of the code, article by article, no longer learning the traditional teachings of natural law.

However, this approach was not without contradictions and illusions. First, such "legal absolutism", as legal historian Paolo Grossi termed it, resulted in a static legal system, "anchored to the authority of the law as an objective fact", which was difficult to reconcile with a society that continued to evolve. Secondly, it proved to be a utopian ideal, as no code, however well-written or comprehensive, could ever be entirely self-sufficient in addressing every case a judge might encounter. Consequently, even the French exegetical jurists eventually engaged in a form of subtle interpretation of the code's provisions and the legislator's intent—though always without appealing to external sources or natural law.

== In the 19th century ==
=== Restoration and law ===
With Napoleon's abdication following his defeat in the War of the Sixth Coalition, the Congress of Vienna opened in 1814. Its purpose appeared to be to redraw the political map of Europe and restore the Ancien Régime. The diplomatic work was carried out respecting the "principle of legitimacy", according to which dynastic power had absolute value since it was assigned by divine right and therefore a restoration of sovereigns to their "legitimate" thrones was to take place. In addition, Congress denied the principle of constitutionalism and the theory of the division of powers. This imposition soon aroused fierce resistance that resulted in the formation of opposition secret societies, including, in the Italian peninsula, the Carboneria. In short, the order proposed by the congress foundered with the uprisings of 1820–1821, which led to the granting, though promptly revoked, of some constitutions.

== Codes in pre-unitarian Italy ==
Napoleonic rule over the Italian peninsula left an awareness of the need for a codification of law, and in many many pre-unitary states, work began on this based on the French legacy. The Kingdom of the Two Sicilies was the first when, after two years' work, in 1819, it approved a set of five codes modeled on the Napoleonic codes, although with major differences, especially in family law not recognizing, for example, civil marriage and divorce. Longer was the gestation of the Civil Code for the States of Parma, Piacenza, and Guastalla of 1820, which succeeded in achieving "a balance between tendencies not easily reconciled" thanks to a synthesis between the French and Austrian models.

In the Kingdom of Sardinia, after a return to the legislation before the Napoleonic occupation, people began to think about autonomous codification. The most concrete result was achieved in 1837 with the enactment of the Albertine Code, consisting of 2,415 articles divided into three books. According to its provisions, Catholic marriage turned out to be the only one allowed, divorce was not permitted, males and females were equalized in legitimate succession, and the majorat survived for noble families along with the institution of the fedecommissum, despite the opposition of Giuseppe Barbaroux, the main author of the code. Thereafter followed the penal code, the commercial code, the code of criminal procedure, and the code of civil procedure.

The return of the House of Lorraine to the Grand Duchy of Tuscany resulted in the immediate repeal of the Napoleonic codes, except the commercial code. Some attempts at codification, first by Vittorio Fossombroni and then by Pietro Capei, came to nothing, which is why Tuscany continued to follow the common law until the Unification of Italy. Lombardy-Veneto, back in the Austrian Empire, transposed the Austrian codes.

=== German historical school of law ===
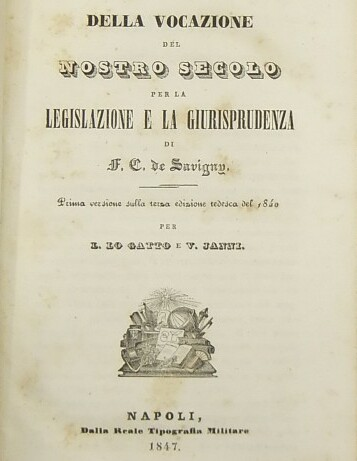
Title page of "Vocation of Our Age for Legislation and Jurisprudence" by Von Savigny, a work considered the manifesto of the historical school of law, written in response to Thibaut's treatise by which he promoted a codification of German law

At the beginning of the 19th century, Germany was in a very different situation from that of pre-revolutionary France. Its multitude of political realities had already benefited from reforms, either because they adhered to the Protestant Reformation or because they were ruled by enlightened rulers, so there was little need to revolutionize the order. Moreover, the Napoleonic Wars had resulted in a certain mistrust among Germans of what came from France; even during the occupation by Napoleon's troops, judges in German courts had applied the civil code reticently. Therefore, the idea of proceeding with a codification of the law did not find many supporters among the people of the Germanic Confederation. One of the most significant exceptions was Anton Friedrich Justus Thibaut, professor of law in Heidelberg and author of a treatise entitled On the Necessity of a General Civil Code in Germany, written shortly after the War of Liberation of 1813 on the wave of nationalist enthusiasm. In Thibaut's opinion, a code would be essential for the modernization of German society and for "preserving and consolidating the national spirit (ethos)" as a prelude to unification.

This treatise provoked the reaction of another jurist, Friedrich Carl von Savigny, who began a dispute with Thibaut over whether or not to have a code. Savigny's response allowed for the emergence of a new doctrine and the "historical school of law", soon influenced by Romanticism and the thought of Gustav Hugo, (Note: Although it is agreed that it was Gustav Hugo who laid the foundation of the German historical school, unanimously Savigny is considered its true initiator and major exponent, outlining its doctrine) in complete opposition to natural lawism. Savigny, taking to extremes some concepts from the works of Thomasius and Montesquieu, came to regard codes as a useless, or even harmful, operation. He believed that law should not be the exclusive production of a legislature but that it was to be constructed from history using the work of jurists, the only ones capable of understanding the spirit of the people (Volksgeist). Savigny brought as an example Roman law, which was, in his view, the best and which had been developed without substantial intervention by the legislature but by jurists. The jurist, for von Savigny, thus had to be an expert not only in jurisprudence but also in history, since it was in it that he had to investigate to extrapolate norms; for him, "law is first created by popular customs and beliefs and then by jurisprudence, which is always the work therefore of inner forces acting silently and not of the arbitrariness of the legislature." The adoption of a code would have "arrested the evolution of law, which, like languages, knows no moment of absolute stasis." As people evolved, the law had to evolve accordingly as well. The historical school, however, did not exclude the intervention of the legislature altogether, as it was still deemed necessary to regulate certain matters, such as family law or procedural law to "contain the anarchies of lawyers and avoid lengthy trials", or to give accomplished form to custom, evidencing the actual will of the people without uncertainty.

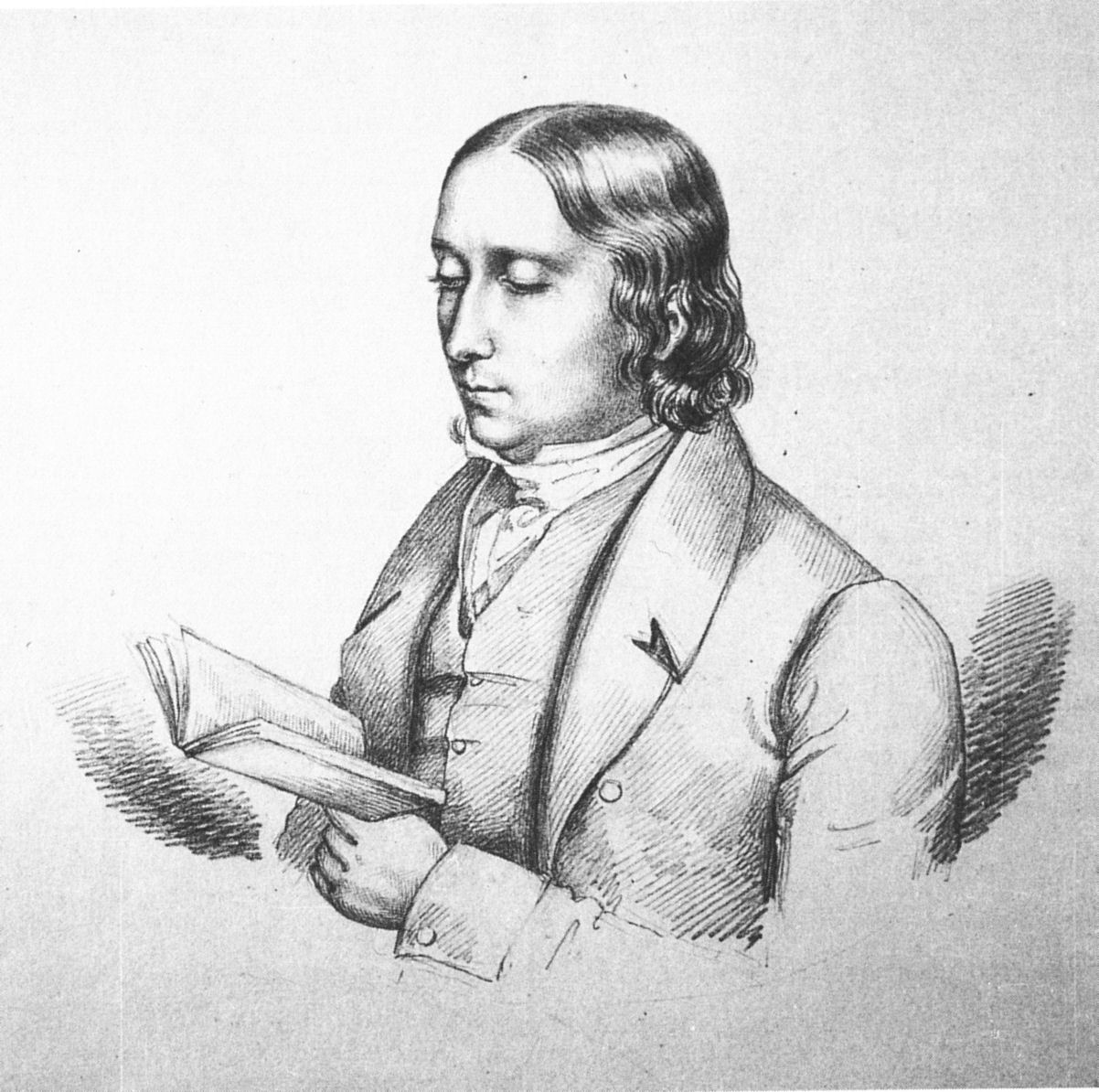
Friedrich Carl von Savigny

Because of its ambition to research law in history, the school made much use of Justinian sources and studied with a philological approach reminiscent of the cultic humanists to grasp their true original meaning. The aim appeared to be to overcome the medieval commentators, who, according to these jurists, had corrupted them. These operations also led von Savigny and his collaborators to carry out a recovery of the Institutions of Gaius (the sole work of classical Roman jurisprudence preserved directly to the present day), a writing recently discovered after centuries of oblivion in the Chapter Library of Verona.

The historical school was a great success, and in fact, even if for other reasons, no codices were produced in Germany until the end of the century. Certainly, its fortunes were facilitated by the changing cultural context in which it was embedded, taking into account the twilight of rationalism typical of the Enlightenment in favor of the Romantic movement. In addition, there was a need in Germany for a new current of legal thought that would differentiate itself from the traditional, naturalistic jurisprudence coming out of the universities, which were considered too far removed from practice and still tied to the Elegant Dutch School of the 17th century. The achievements of legal historicism were remarkable. Notable among them were the development of "a dogmatics based on legal systematics and inductive and deductive methods", an analytical study of fundamental legal concepts, and the differentiation between subjective and objective law.

=== Pandettistica ===
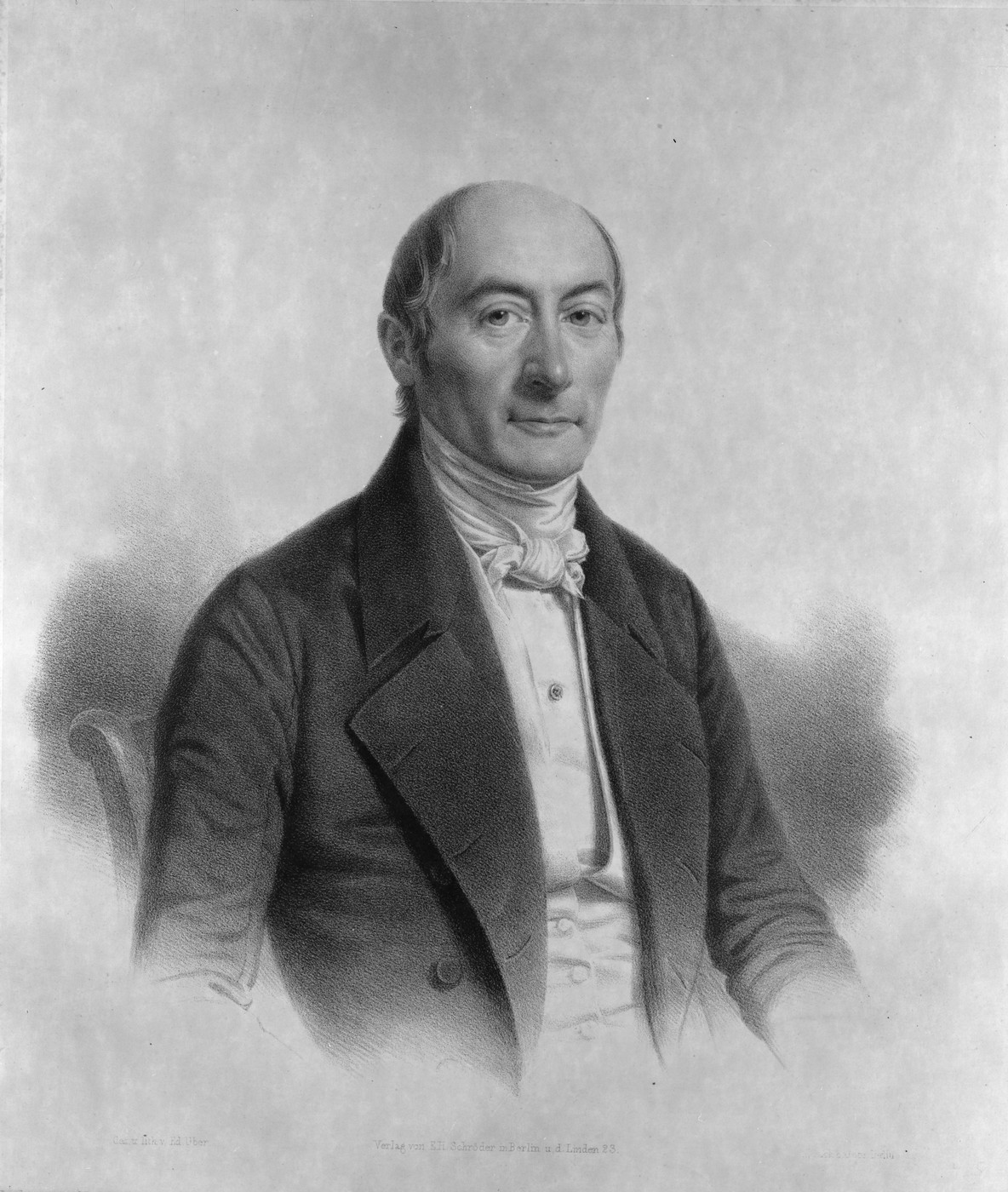
Georg Friedrich Puchta

A continuation of the historical school of law was the Pandette (or pandettistic) school, whose major exponent was Georg Friedrich Puchta. The school owed its name to the "pandettes", a 50-book compilation of fragments of works by Roman jurists contained in Justinian's corpus iuris civilis, and of which the members aimed at a critical study aimed at its conceptual reworking. Other notable exponents were Alois von Brinz, Ludwig Arndts von Arnesberg, Heinrich Dernburg, and, above all, Bernhard Windscheid.

The main idea of the Pandettists was strongly permeated by 19th-century nationalism, which proposed a sovereign state closed in on itself and devoid of non-formal communication with other states. Consequently, in parallel, the adherents of this current legal system were to constitute a completely closed system in which the jurist had to find the sought-after solution without venturing outside. The most noteworthy achievement of the pandette school was, above all, the elaboration of the concept of "legal transaction", unknown to Roman law but the basis of the modern doctrine of contract whose essential requirements it outlined.

Although pandettistics proposed itself from its inception as a doctrine opposed to codification, its studies nevertheless contributed to the emergence of the need for a positive law in tune with the liberal ideals that were becoming increasingly established. Moreover, the formal methods applied to the study of the digest were later used in the critique of other codes as well. Ultimately, it was the Pandettists, and in particular Windscheid, who laid the foundations for the future German Civil Code.

=== Constitutions after the uprisings of 1848 ===
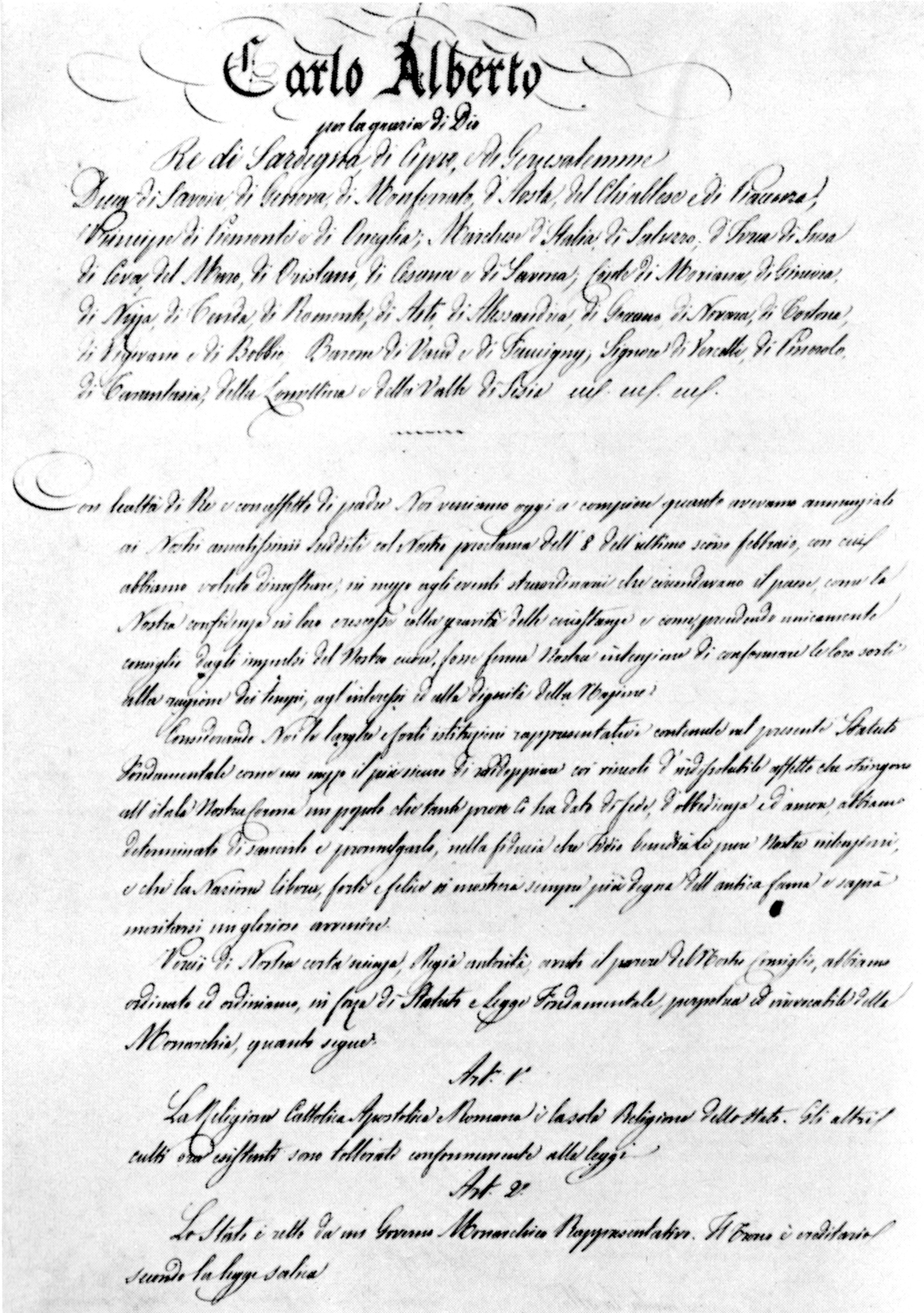
Front page of the Albertine Statute

In response to the restoration attempted with the Congress of Vienna, in 1848 Europe was hit by a revolutionary wave that went down in history as the "people's spring" and involved workers, intellectuals, and students. The demands were essentially common: universal suffrage, freedom of the press and association, the granting of a constitution, and the improvement of working conditions. The insurgents immediately achieved results: in the Kingdom of Sicily, Ferdinand I of Bourbon was forced to accept the constitution enacted by the Parliament (thus not obtruded), while in the Papal States, Pope Pius IX had to grant freedom of the press and a statute. Such examples were soon followed by Parma and Modena as well. In France, after a peaceful beginning, demonstrations degenerated into violence and barricades began to appear: on February 24 King Louis Philippe abdicated to make way for the Second French Republic, governed by its constitution and elected by universal male suffrage, raising the electoral body from fewer than 200,000 citizens to nearly 10 million. In Prussia, the most important state in the Germanic confederation and still firmly entrenched in the conservatism of the Ancien Régime system, the revolutionaries succeeded in pushing Frederick William IV to authorize a constituent assembly with universal male suffrage to make a constitution.

The initial revolutionary drive faded in the following months due to the insurgents' lack of organization and unity, thwarting many achievements; in the Austrian Empire, the uprisings were forcibly suppressed even before the constitutional project could see the light of day. However, there is no doubt that "1848 was decisive for the establishment of the principles of modern constitutionalism."

Lasting results, however, were had in the Kingdom of Sardinia, where on March 4, 1848, Charles Albert of Sardinia issued the Statuto Albertino, which in 1861, with the founding of the Kingdom of Italy, became the fundamental charter of the newly united Italy. It was an octriate constitutional charter, one granted by the will of a sovereign and not drafted by an assembly of 81 articles, which outlined the structures of the state. The revolutionary wave left profound effects in Portugal as well: in 1850 António Luís de Seabra, a jurist and supporter of constitutional monarchy, was commissioned to produce a draft for a civil code that would later be officially promulgated in 1867. Of note is the case of Sweden, which already had its constitution as early as 1809, and that of the Kingdom of Norway, which promulgated its own on May 17, 1814, thus well before the 1848 uprisings swept across the continent.

=== Karl Marx: scientific socialism ===
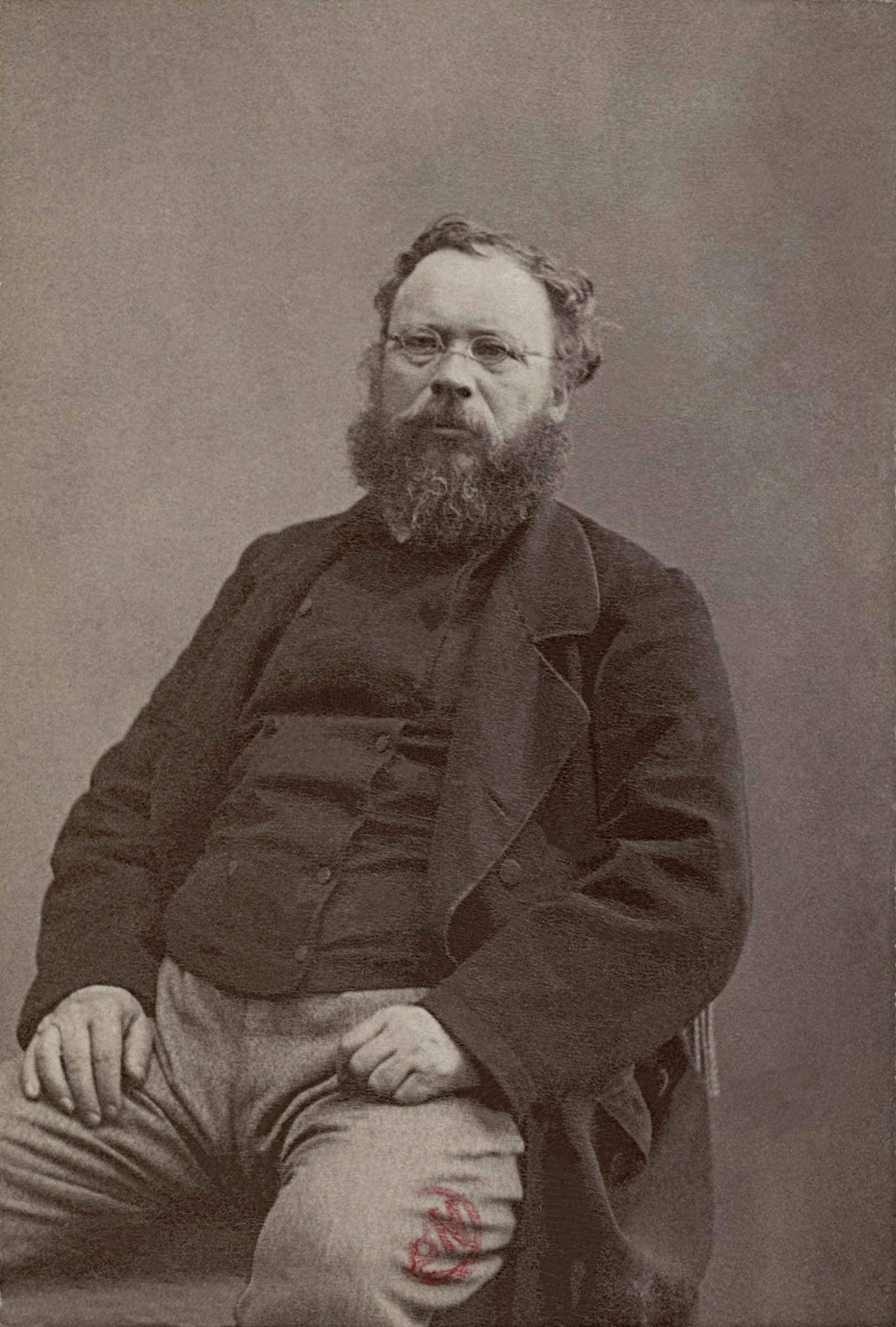
Pierre-Joseph Proudhon

"Enlightenment jusnaturalism" had always been an expression of the ideals and demands of the bourgeoisie. With the advent of industrialization, social issues concerning the problems that accused the working class began to be recognized by many intellectuals of the time, leading to the development of new doctrines and orientations that took the name "socialism". Initially, these were only theoretical conceptualizations, later relegated to utopian socialism of which Pierre-Joseph Proudhon, Charles Fourier, and Robert Owen were among the protagonists. It was, however, from the Hegelian left, a current of thought born of disciples of Hegel, that more concrete answers to the social problems of the time came. Among the first, Ludwig Feuerbach, proposed a new approach to philosophy, which, in his view, was to be more focused on "man in his entirety, who is not only spirit and reason but also body and sensibility" thus also having to consider the reality he lived in and "his needs of all kinds, including material needs."

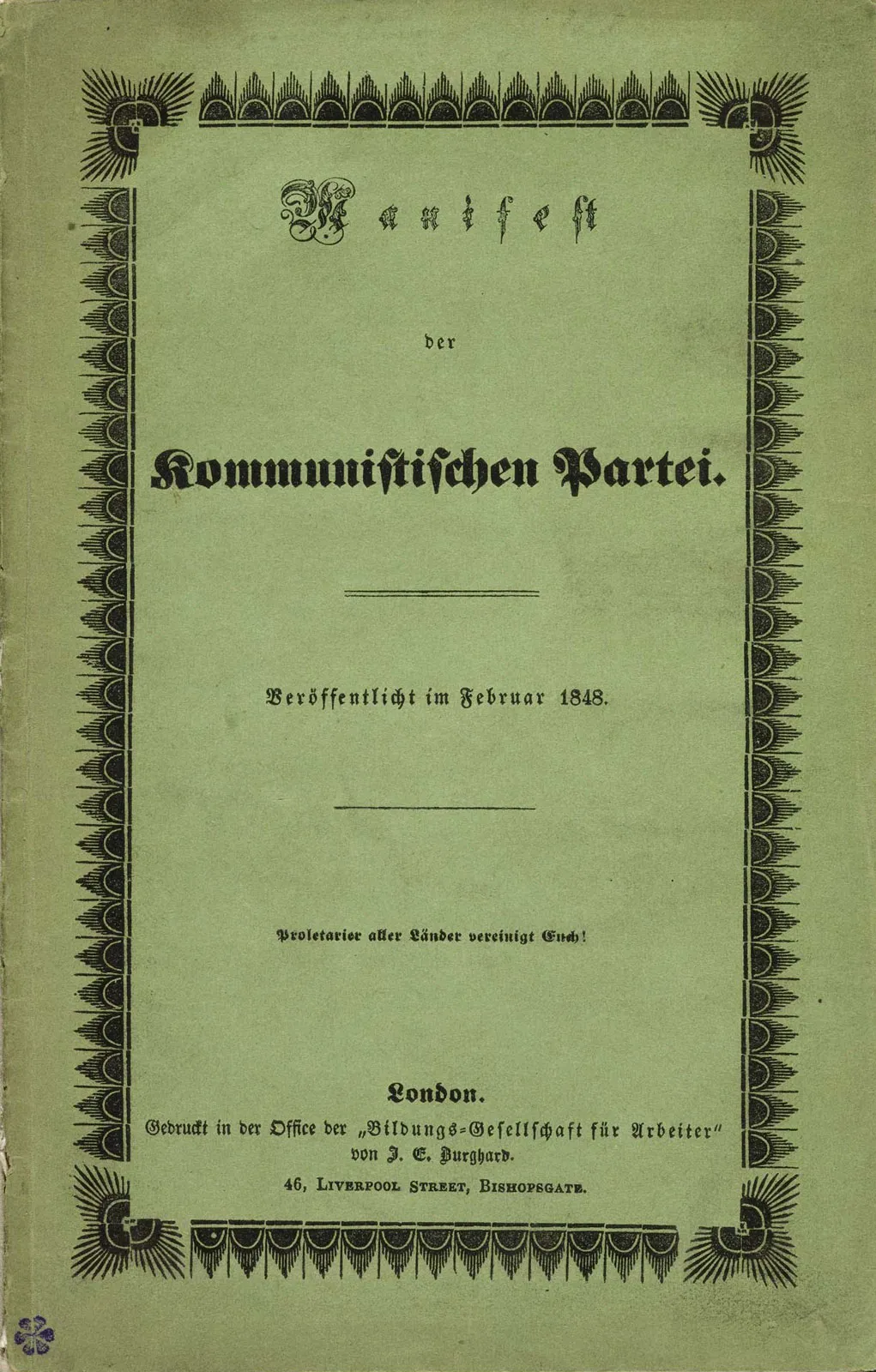
The first edition of the Communist Party Manifesto

Karl Marx resumed materialistic thought, giving birth to dialectical materialism and that more concrete current of scientific socialism. According to this doctrine, economic relations are the only structure on which human relations are based, while everything else is a superstructure, as are morality, religion, and even law. Marx, therefore, does not recognize law as particularly important since, as a superstructure, it is only one of the characters in which the economic evolution of society is expressed. In The Capital, Marx gives the example of how English legislation on factories was developed based on the needs of the large industries that were the protagonists of the economic fabric of the time. So, if the law is linked to society, it will change as society changes; it will be the "class conflict" that will change the power relations within the social context and have sure repercussions on the law as well. In practice, with the end of the bourgeois society theorized by Marx, there will also be the abandonment of previous legislation (reference is made in particular to the Napoleonic code) as an expression of the bourgeoisie in favor of another system that with the victory of the proletariat will lead, according to what is stated in the Communist Manifesto, to "an association in which the free development of each will be the condition for the free development of all."

By relegating law to a mere superstructure, Marx did not make a major contribution to legal history but paved the way for later theories of legal socialism. Ferdinand Lassalle, building on historical materialism, envisioned a future elimination of private property, noting that "every great progress of civilization consists in a restriction of the dimensions of property." Anton Menger was a staunch advocate of the need for a right that was "the result of reflection" and aimed "for the good of the broad masses of the people." He was moving more and more toward the recognition of the need for laws with a social character.

=== Law and society ===
During the 19th century, European society experienced substantial transformations, with inevitable repercussions in the field of law. The role of women turned out to be the subject of lengthy debates beginning in the 1880s when legislative changes timidly paved the way for some rights. In both France and Victorian England, divorce was recognized for certain scenarios, although excluding mutual consent, while the wife was given limited capacity to act and some rights to property acquired during the marriage. The position of illegitimate children also experienced legislative recognition.

To cope with the large sums of money needed to give rise to the large productive enterprises typical of the Industrial Revolution, joint-stock companies, in which several partners pooled their economic resources, existed. On a legislative level, their founding was facilitated by the abolition of discretionary government authorization in favor of a simple, type-approved deed of incorporation. This model, "a milestone toward economic liberalism", was introduced in England beginning in 1844 and followed in the Germanic regions and France in 1867; in Italy, it was concretized with the Commercial Code of 1882. The enormous expansion of the railroad network led to an increase in commerce, with the consequent need for new legislative instruments. Thus began to appear, first in England and then reflexively on the Continent, innovative legal institutions such as the commercial lien, the naval mortgage, general warehouses, and the auctioning of goods in bulk. The insurance industry experienced great growth, while the criminal and civil consequences of bankruptcy were mitigated and composed with creditors favored in certain circumstances.

The social drama of extreme poverty in which much of the proletarian population found itself found a feeble response in legislation. Again, it was England that was the first country to move down this road, passing the New Poor Laws in 1834, by which substantial centralization of assistance to the poor was attempted and the system of workhouses introduced. The idea of the need for social insurance and a pension system to meet the most basic needs of the population began to take root, but it took decades to achieve the first concrete results.

Among the European powers, however, the Russian Empire was the one in the most socially backward condition. The state was highly autocratic, and power was centralized in the tsar; almost the entire population was employed in agriculture, and serfdom was still very much present. After ascending the throne in 1855, Alexander II began a series of reforms aimed at modernizing the country: in 1861, he signed a controversial law emancipating serfdom, innovated the tax administration by increasing its efficiency, and improved the university system. The assassination in 1881 of the tsar and the succession of his son, Alexander III, led to the cancellation of most progressive reforms and the establishment of a reactionary policy.

=== In England ===
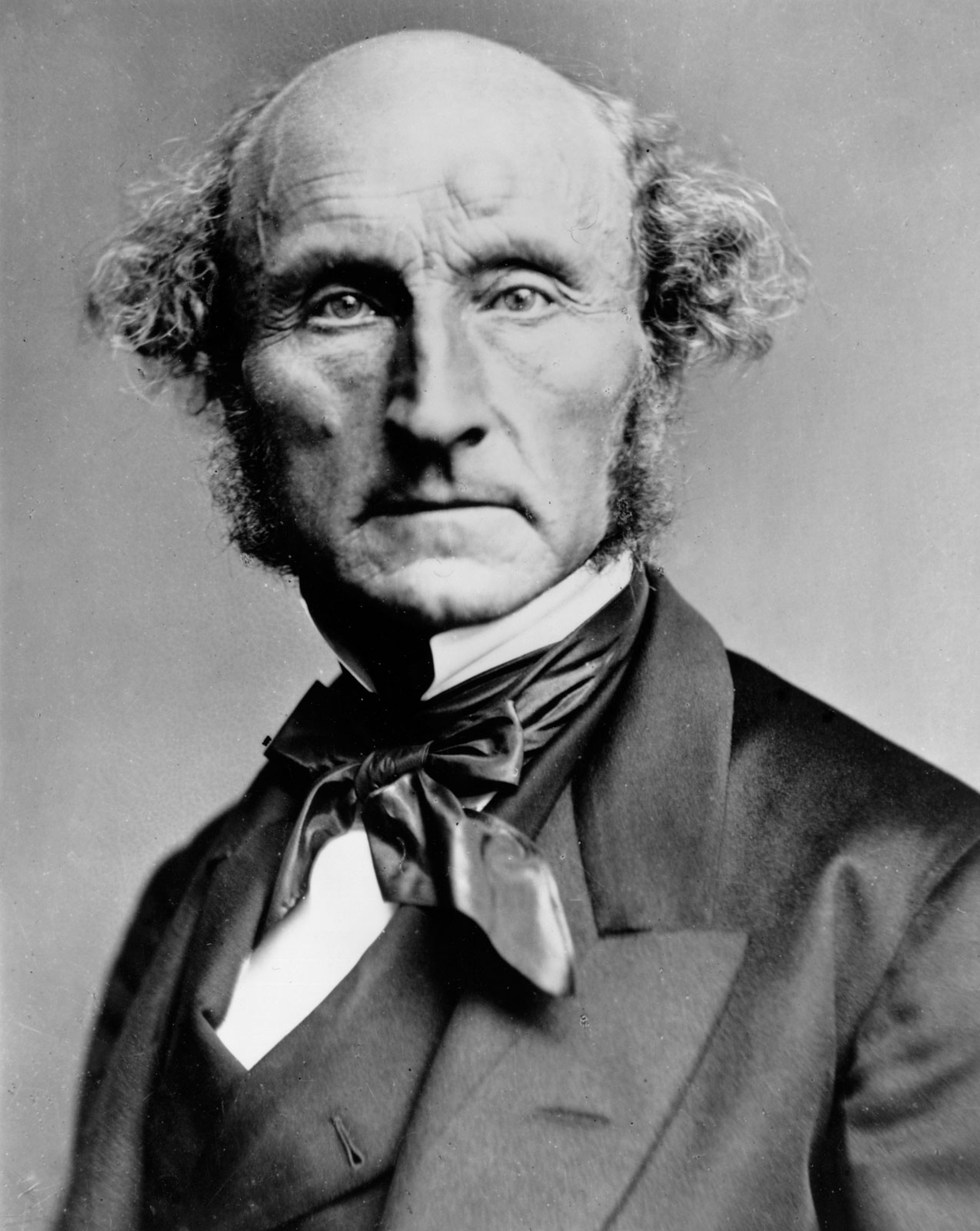
John Stuart Mill is considered one of the leading exponents of classical liberalism

The idea of codifying the law for its stabilization, which originated in France and spread to much of Europe, was coldly received in England whose legal system (known as common law) differed well from the continental one. Across the Channel, the law had for centuries been largely in the hands of judges, who constructed it through their decisions according to the principle of stare decisis. Therefore, government intervention in a codification effort was perceived as a serious intrusion, just the opposite of the Ancien Régime states, which interpreted it as a limitation on the sovereign's powers. However, even in England, no shortage of jurists sided with the codictic model. These included Londoner Jeremy Bentham, who held Enlightenment views but at the same time advocated utilitarianism. Bentham spared no criticism of the English system, believing that the use of codification was necessary to give simplicity, universality, and certainty to laws. He hoped to achieve this result through the drafting of three codes, namely the civil, the constitutional, and finally, the criminal codes. His proposals found no practical response, although they influenced his disciple James Mill, and, even more, the latter's son, John Stuart Mill.

Although the latter was an ardent advocate of legal positivism, he differed from his master by taking a more lenient stance in his evaluation of the English system: he considered common law to be a right in its own right, in that it was the state that vested the power of production in the courts. John Stuart Mill, moreover, was an advocate of the principle of equality among all men, including women, a rather innovative position for the time. The scholar is best remembered for his staunch support of utilitarianism, of which he is considered one of the leading exponents: indeed, much of his interpretation of the function of law was traced back toward social utility rather than to the satisfaction of individual needs.

=== Codification in Spain ===
The Spanish Constitution of 1812 (also known as the "Cadiz Constitution"), with its nationalist tone in response to the ongoing Napoleonic occupation, served as an impetus for the project of an initial codification of commercial law, which was completed in 1829 with the enactment of the "Código de Comercio de España", of which the Andalusian jurist Pedro Sainz de Andino was the main architect. An initial project for a Spanish civil code based on the French model began in 1851, but it met strong resistance from those who opposed the repeal of traditional norms in force in the various regions of the country, particularly regarding successions, property rights, and certain contracts. This led to a debate in which, ultimately, the idea prevailed of creating a unified text, provided it also safeguarded local particularities. The result, after another failure in 1881, was a code enacted in 1888 with a supplementary function. Its purpose was to be applied in cases where regional norms (fuero) did not regulate the matter or presented a gap. Ample space was also given to customs, although they had to be proven and not conflict with the law, public order, or morality.

== Straddling the two centuries ==
=== German civil code (BGB) ===
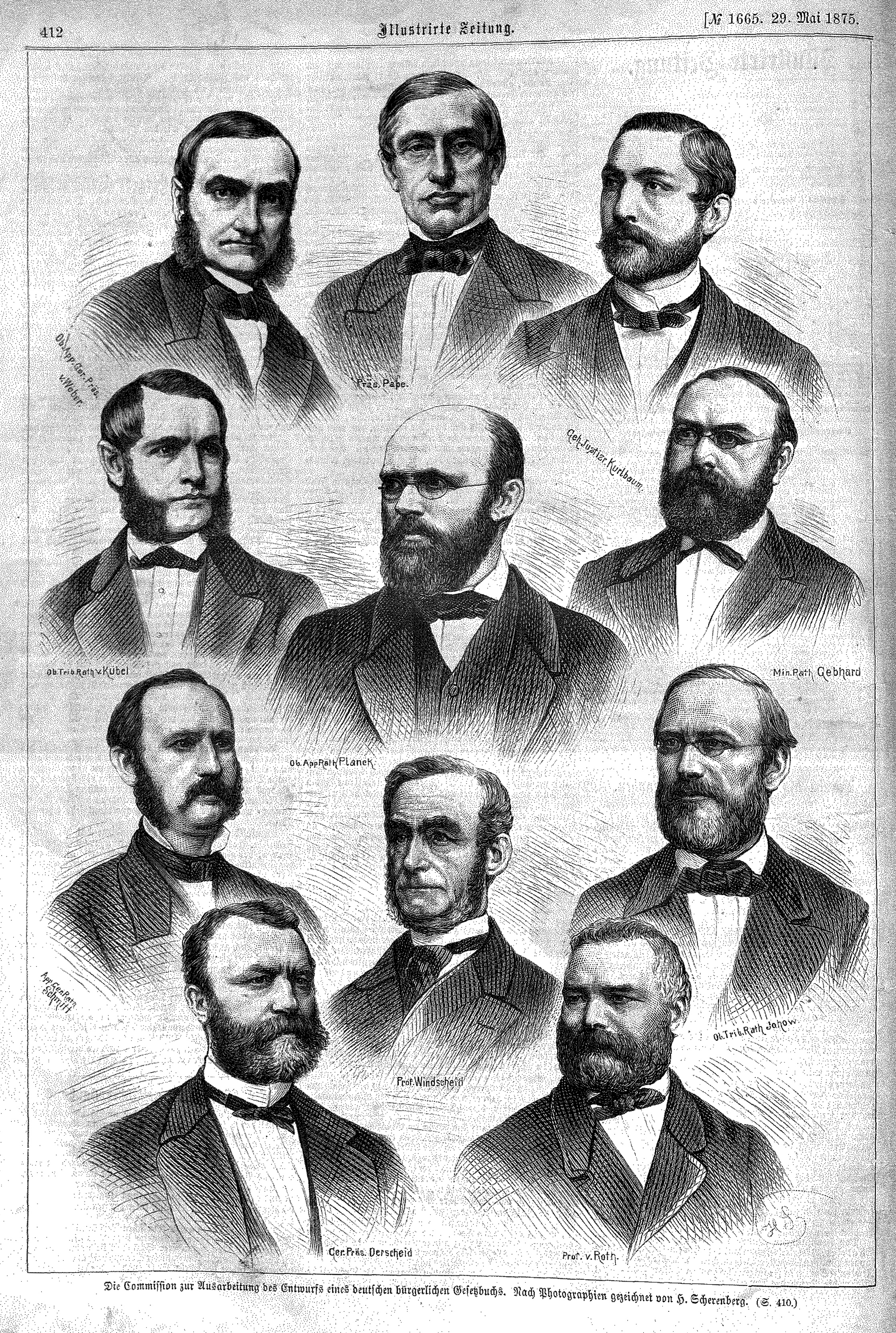
The first commission for drafting the German Civil Code

The influences of the historical school and the political fragmentation in which the Germanic region found itself in the first half of the 18th century contributed to delaying the start of a process of legal codification, but the German unification completed in 1871 under the guidance of Otto von Bismarck changed things. In reality, as early as 1861, a commercial code (called ADHGB) had been enacted and quickly adopted by all the states of the confederation. The protagonist of this work was the jurist Levin Goldschmidt, who contributed to the creation of a practical and modern code, focused on commercial transactions rather than the person of the merchant, capable of regulating many situations ranging from railway transport to credit and companies.

The genesis of the civil code proved to be much lengthier. The decision to proceed in this direction was due to the fear that, shortly, each state of the confederation might adopt its territorial code. This fear was sparked by the example of Saxony, which had been the last to enact one and seemed to threaten the unification of the newly formed nation. In 1873, a first preliminary commission, chaired by Goldschmidt, outlined the foundations of the future code, deciding that it would be free of certain institutions deemed outdated, such as feudal tenure and entail. The following year, a new commission began drafting the text, consisting of eleven members, including Paul von Roth and the pandectist Bernhard Windscheid. The work was completed over thirteen years later, with a first draft of the code that, however, received numerous criticisms. In particular, it was judged as a code too tied to Roman law and insufficiently rooted in German legal tradition, to the point of being considered by Otto von Gierke "the epitome of Windscheid's work." The socialist Anton Menger noted, instead, how it reflected the expectations of the bourgeois society of the time, showing little attention to the problems of the proletariat. Both agreed on its "excessive technicality and obscure language." A new commission established in 1891 worked for five years to address its flaws, succeeding only partially, as the Social Democrats opposed it in the Reichstag until its final approval, (Note: During the parliamentary session, Social Democratic deputies would wait for "the code of law or the code of accomplished social justice".) which occurred in 1896; the code then came into effect on January 1, 1900, marking the end of the validity of Roman law sources in the European legal landscape.

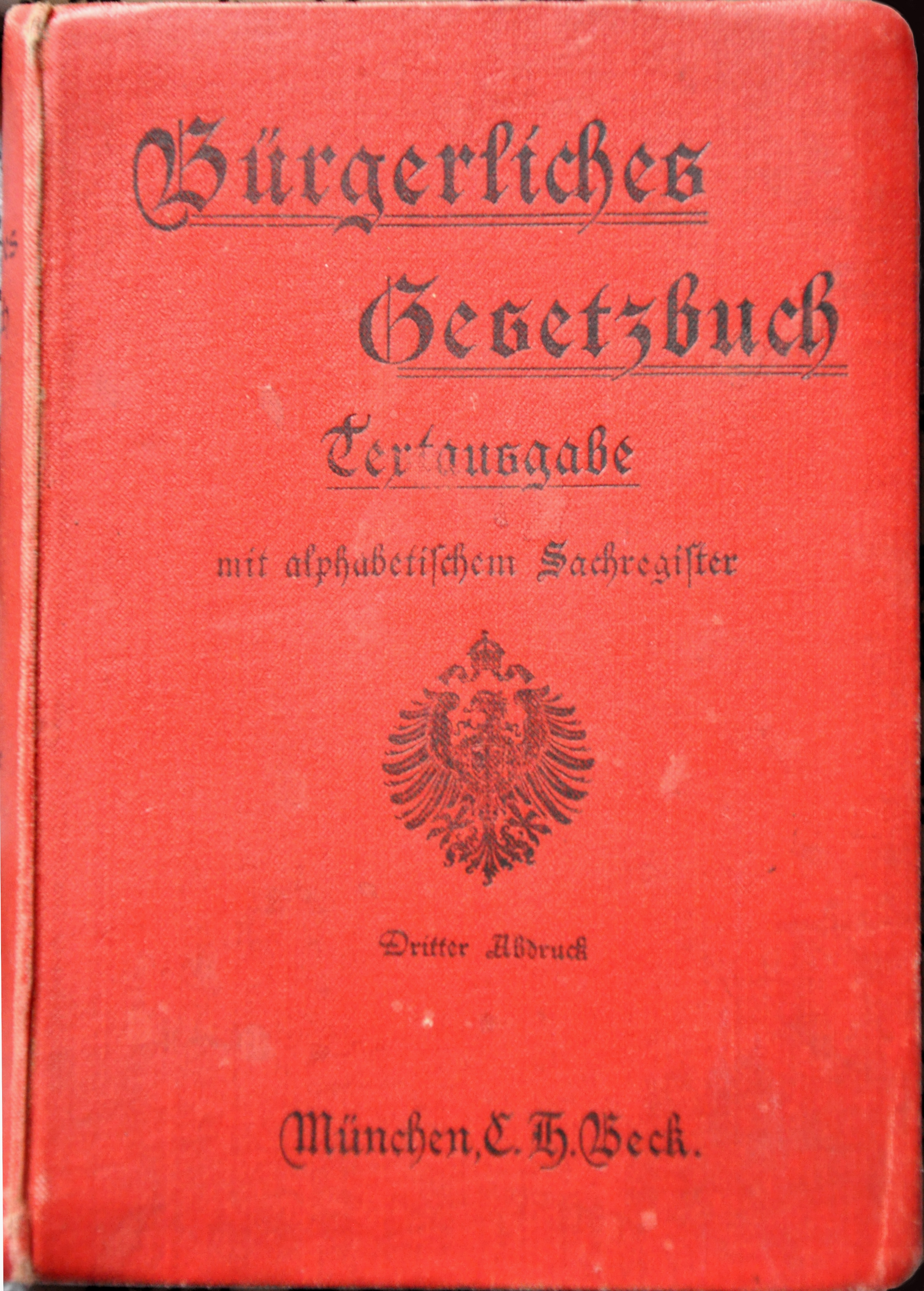
Title page of the German Code of 1896

Despite criticism, the Bürgerliches Gesetzbuch (BGB) is considered "one of the great legislative monuments of 19th-century Europe", as well as a bearer of certain modernities. Divided into five books (general part, obligations, property, family, succession), it was characterized by highly technical language and a doctrinal approach rooted in pandectism, making it implicitly intended for an audience of jurists. Its ideological foundation was undoubtedly liberal and positivist, but certain general clauses regarding good faith, good morals, and just cause still left some room for judicial interpretation. The regulation of contracts was based on the concept, developed by pandectists, of the "legal transaction", which was outlined as early as the first book. Family law centered on paternal authority, although the wife could resort to judicial authority in specific cases of disagreement. Civil marriage was provided for, and divorce was possible for certain reasons but not by mutual consent. Property was absolute, considered as the exclusive dominion of the individual, while its transfer occurred through the actual delivery of the thing (by the traditio of Roman law), with the addition of registration in land registries for real estate. A product of jurisprudential development, the "institute of Verwirkung" also found its first expression in the code.

Some concessions made to the socialists, defined as "drops of social oil", appeared, for example, in paragraph 226, which stated that "the exercise of a subjective right is not permitted if its sole purpose is to cause harm to others", or in the provisions favoring workers contained in paragraphs 616 to 618. The German Civil Code, not universally welcomed in its homeland, profoundly influenced 20th-century codifications, both European and beyond (consider Hungary, Greece, Poland, Brazil, Peru, Japan, and China). As of 2025, with some amendments, particularly concerning family law, the BGB of 1896 remains in force in Germany.

=== Birth of labor law ===
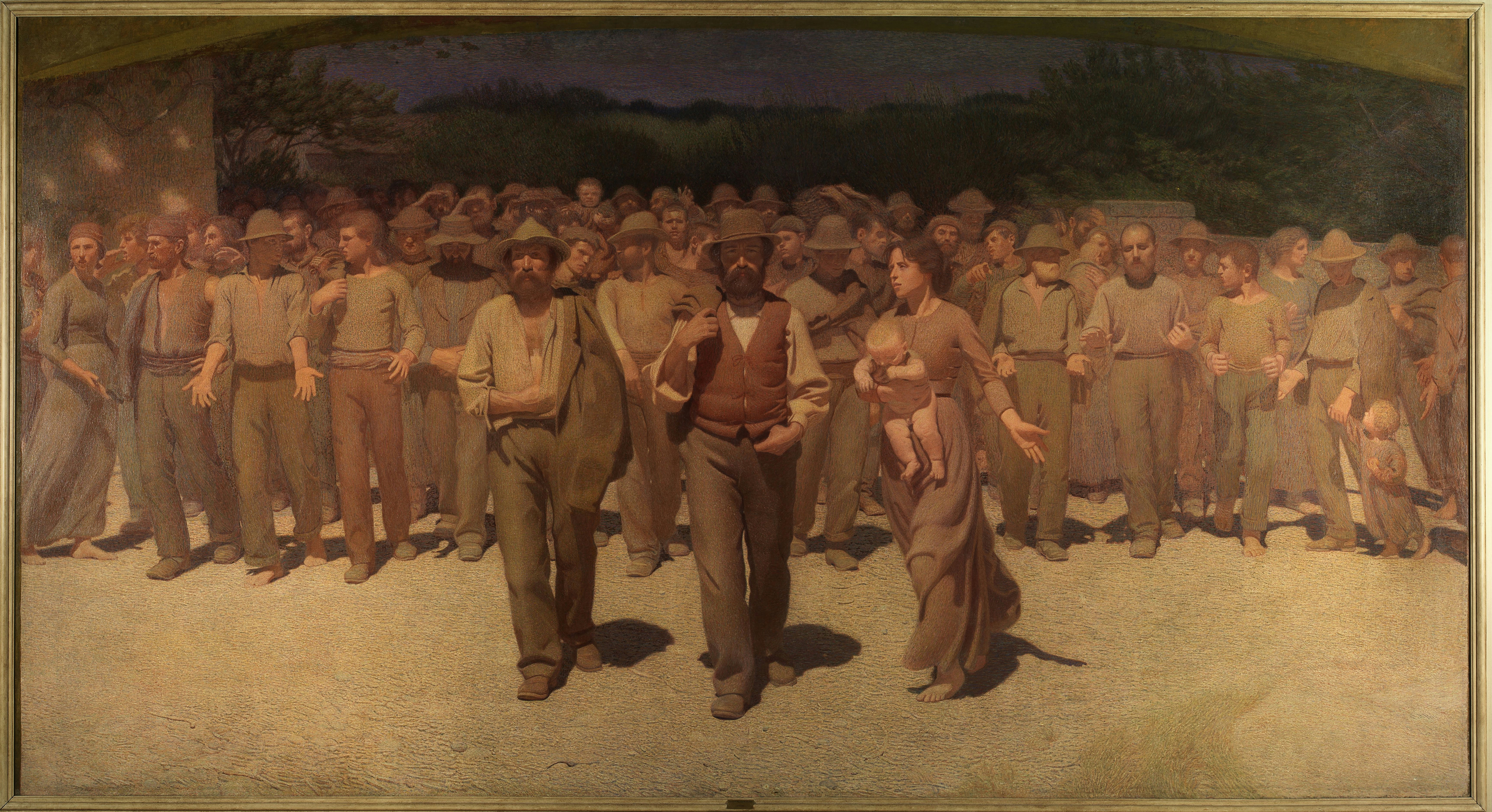
The fourth state painted by Giuseppe Pellizza da Volpedo

The Industrial Revolution led to the upheaval of the social structures of the time, creating a large segment of the population without any protection. In response, the "working class" slowly and laboriously managed to gain social and political weight, obtaining, around the turn of the two centuries, legislative outcomes that marked the birth of labor law. After years in which workers' associations had been banned, in 1871, the "Trade Union Act" was passed in England, through which trade unions were legalized for the first time, although only for those organizations whose statutes had been approved. A few years earlier in France, the offense of coalition established by the Le Chapelier Law of 1791 had been repealed, but it was necessary to wait until March 21, 1884, for the approval of the law proposed by Pierre Waldeck-Rousseau, which legalized trade unions. In Italy, the trade union experience began with mutual aid societies, which in the last decade of the 19th century became structured and gave rise to the Camere del Lavoro (Labor Chambers); with the advent of the Zanardelli Penal Code of 1889, the crime of striking ("if carried out without violence or threat") was repealed, although it remained a source of civil consequences and risk of dismissal.

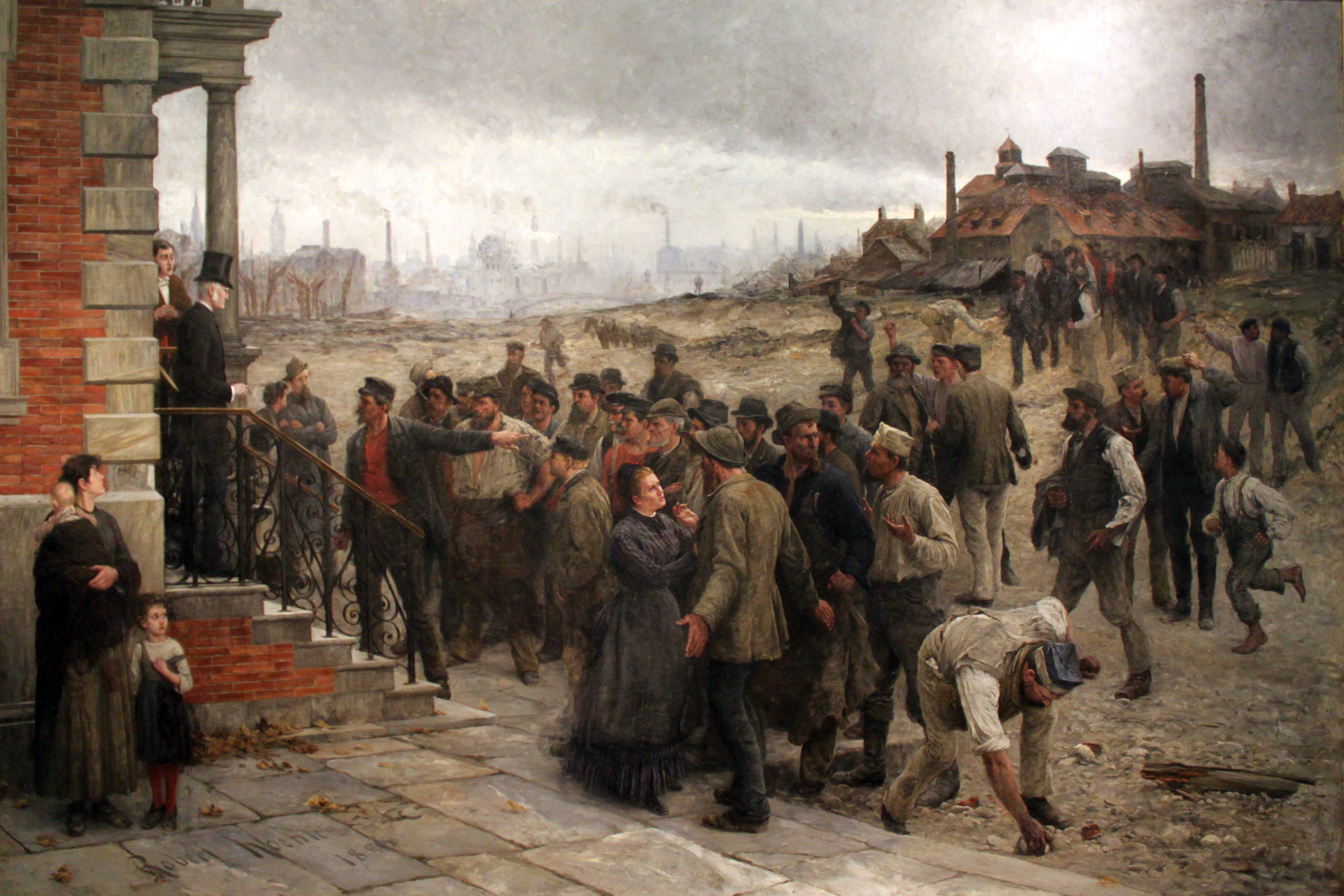
Strike in the Charleroi region, 1886

Otto von Bismarck's Germany, concerned about the growing support for left-wing parties, introduced pioneering reforms to protect workers, "laying the foundations for that complex system of benefits that would come to be known as the Welfare state." As early as 1883, a law on health insurance was passed, followed the next year by mandatory insurance for workplace accidents. In 1889, old-age pensions were introduced. Similar measures were also undertaken in Italy, where, in 1883, the National Institute for Insurance Against Workplace Accidents was established, while between 1902 and 1924 there was intense legislative activity—interrupted only during the Great War—that addressed "the most alarming problems of workers' conditions, through the introduction of rules that limited the entrepreneurial freedom in managing labor."

As for the employment contract, throughout the 19th century, it remained anchored to the model of locatio conductio, derived from the Roman law institution of locatio conductio. This framework positioned the worker as the contractually weaker party within the context of industrial enterprises. (Note: The surplus of unskilled labor and the worker's need for subsistence work had created a "conspicuous disparity of bargaining power" in favor of the entrepreneur.) As early as 1889, the German jurist Otto von Gierke had brought attention to this issue, "emphasizing the personal bond and the relationship of solidarity that connect the employer and the employee within a business." The first example of a specific contractual regulation appeared in Belgium in 1900, followed seven years later by the Netherlands. At the same time, some jurists began to explore the subject of the employment contract more deeply, "paving the way for a new branch of law, destined for major development in the twentieth century"; among them were Lodovico Barassi, Philipp Lotmar, and Hugo Sinzheimer.

=== Legal positivism and its critique ===
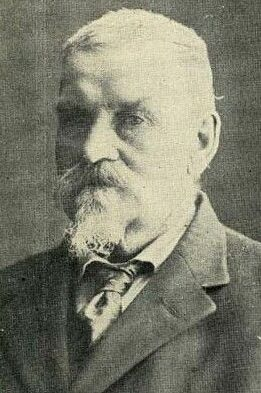
John Austin conceived the legal norm as a command, rejecting natural law and taking legal positivism to its extreme.

In the second half of the 19th century, as a consequence of the successes of the Industrial Revolution, a specific mindset known as positivism became widespread among Europeans. This worldview placed great trust in science and scientific progress, which were seen as the foundations of Social Evolution. From this perspective, everything that was not strictly metaphysical was subjected to rational and scientific reasoning; for many scholars, law fit perfectly within this classification, thus marking the birth of legal positivism. Its principles went largely unchallenged throughout the second half of the 19th century, only to be questioned and contested at beginning of the following century.

==== Centrality of the norm and the problem of the scientific nature of law ====
For positivists, law is a science, just like the natural sciences, and must be approached using the same tools. This entailed a total rejection of natural law since dealing with a scientific subject requires considering only concrete manifestations—in the case of law, the norms, that is, the "positive" element. Thus, for positivists, the "legal norm" is the sole expression of law (a theory later taken up and expanded by Hans Kelsen). John Austin went so far as to conceive it as a "command", giving rise to the doctrine of imperativism, a branch of positivism.

The scientific approach to law was not without its critics and alternative perspectives. For instance, the British thinker Herbert Spencer applied Charles Darwin's recently developed theory of evolution to argue that law was a product of human evolution that developed in a utilitarian fashion. According to this theory, the aim was to ensure the peaceful existence of humanity, and therefore, true rights were not to be sought in the laws of the state, but in the higher principle of "freedom", summarized in the Kantian-like maxim: "every man is free to do what he wills, provided he does not infringe the equal freedom of any other". This was a position in which science was applied to law, but without leading to a fully positivist view.

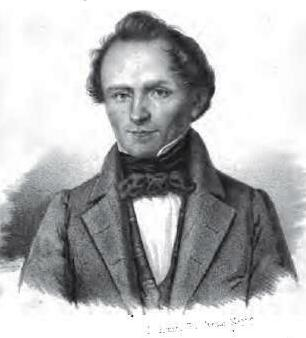
Julius von Kirchmann expressed doubts about the classification of law as a science.

The postulate of the scientific nature of law was not universally accepted. Julius von Kirchmann observed that science studies natural phenomena through an objective understanding of their manifestations without needing to consider human thought and involvement—something that is, however, essential in the case of law. He concluded that law could not be assimilated to a natural science but rather to a different, specific type of science.

In contrast, Wilhelm Wundt argued that both natural phenomena and those of the spirit (such as law) could be studied scientifically. He recognized that the approach to the former was essentially passive (i.e., through mere naturalistic observation), while the approach to the latter was active, as it required subjective interpretation. Therefore, in the case of law, a scientific methodology was indeed necessary, but one that also took into account "the psychological attitude of the legislator, by comparing various norms, interpreting their meaning, and evaluating them critically."

==== Positive school of Italian criminal law ====
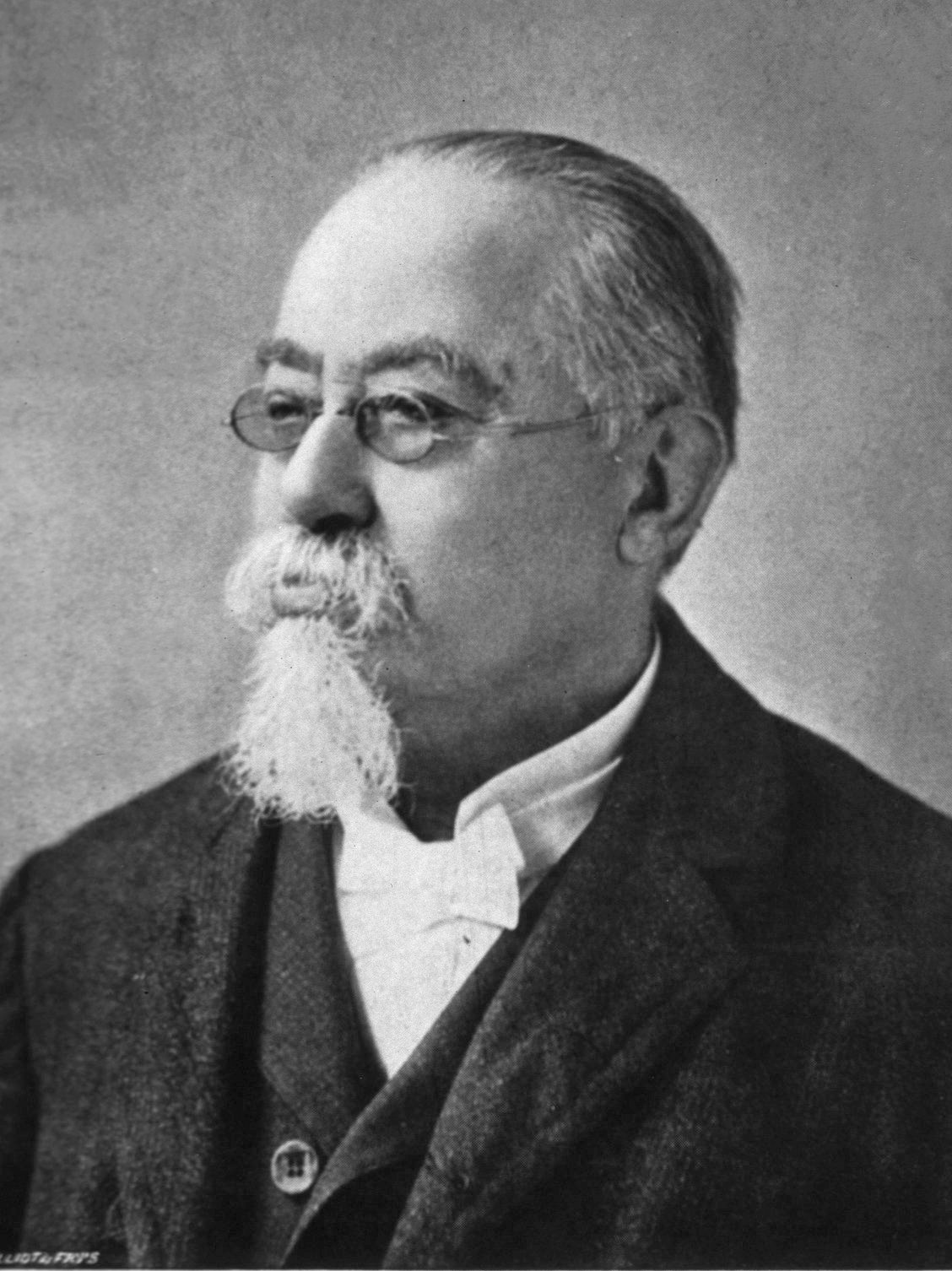
Cesare Lombroso, father of the positive school of criminal law.

Italy has always been very permeable to various legal doctrines, and this was also true for positivism. Several scholars, including Giuseppe Carle, Luigi Miraglia, Raffaele Schiattarella, Roberto Ardigò, and Giovanni Bovio, worked within this movement on the peninsula.

However, it was in the field of criminal law that Italian positivism achieved the most interesting results. Based on the positivist principles provided by Bosio, Cesare Lombroso argued that the inclination to crime was an inherited pathology and that the only useful approach to dealing with criminals was the clinical-therapeutic one. Later, he also considered environmental, educational, and social factors as contributing alongside physical ones in determining criminal behavior. His theories, now considered scientifically unfounded but, which gave rise to the disciplines of criminology and criminal anthropology, were taken up by his student Enrico Ferri, who, regarding the crime, went on to "speak not of personal responsibility but of social or natural responsibility and the sanction, no longer as punishment, but as a physical reaction to an action that has disturbed the order".

==== Formalism and antiformalism: from jurisprudence of concepts to jurisprudence of interests ====
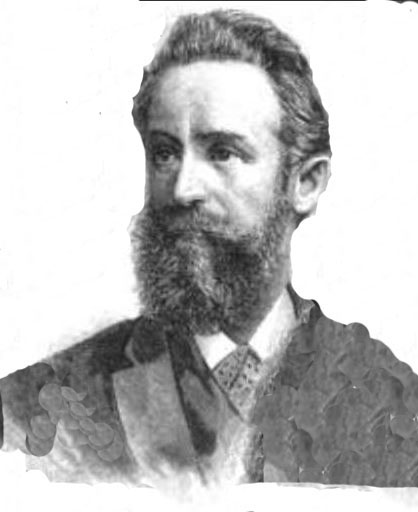
Adolf Merkel

Legal positivism linked the essence of law to norms, and therefore the form of these norms became important. The history of legal formalism traces its origins back to antiquity (with traces found in Roman law), later developing in the learned school of humanists in the 15th–16th centuries. After the neglect of the natural law period, it regained strength in Germany with the doctrinal positions taken by the historical school and the pandectist movement, reaching its peak in the 19th and 20th centuries. It was then that an attempt was made to "make the knowledge of law a system, establishing a logical connection as rigorously as possible between its elements." The goal of the formalists was to achieve a "logical arrangement of law in forms that were meant to be analogous to those of nature". From formalism emerged the "jurisprudence of concepts", which involved "the development of general and abstract concepts based on norms valid only because they exist, having as such the nature of dogma" (legal dogmatics). The results of this school of thought were manifold, notably the development (already proposed by the pandectists) of the concept of "legal transaction" and the concept of the statehood of law, which denied the existence of any law outside that elaborated by the State (thus excluding customary law and international law). Among the most important adherents of legal formalism were Adolf Merkel, August Thon, Ernst Rudolf Bierling, and Karl Magnus Bergbohm, while Paul Laband and Carl Friedrich von Gerber extended this model to public law.

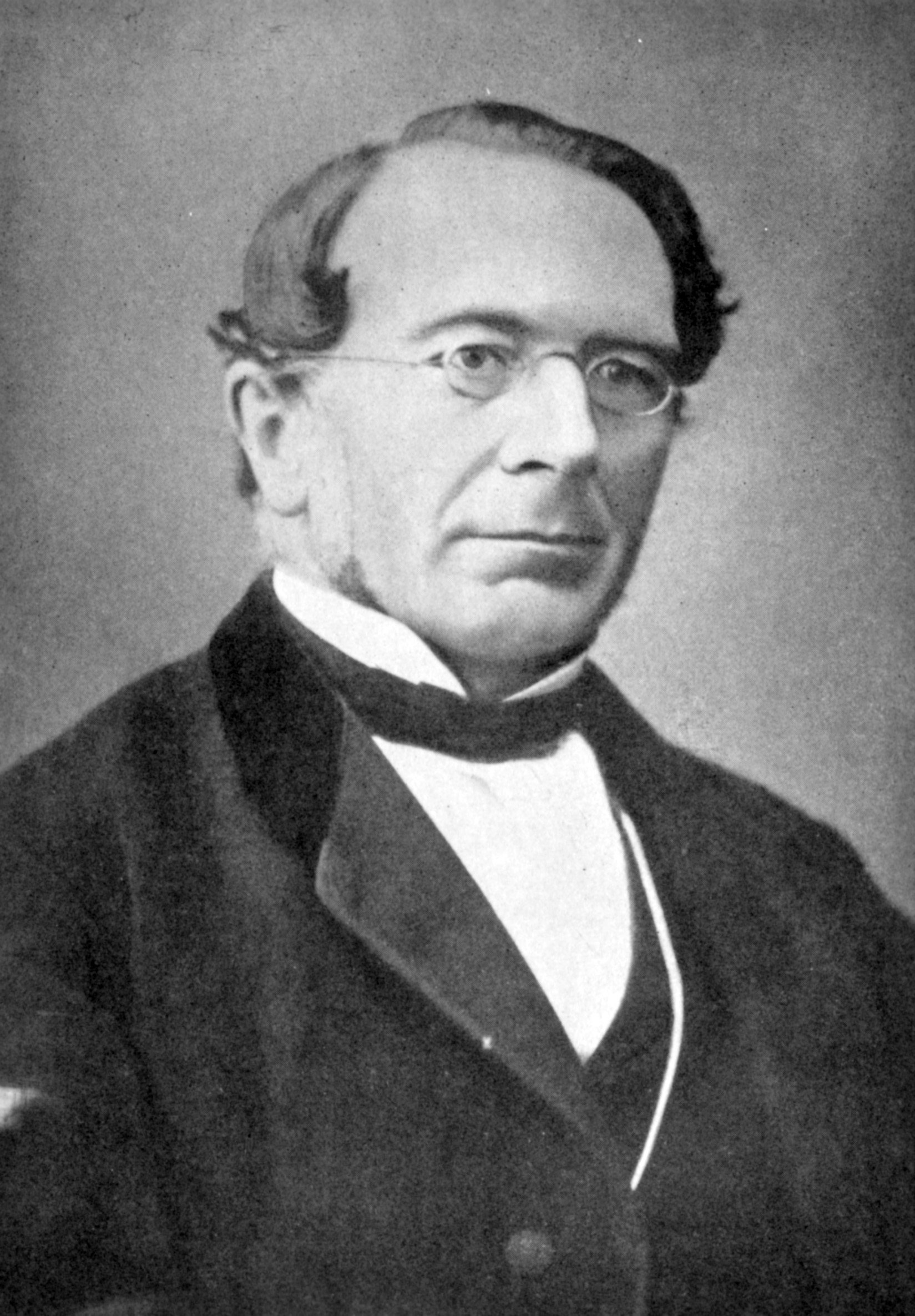
Rudolf von Jhering

Legal formalism attracted several criticisms, foremost among them those of the jurist Rudolf von Jhering, who had initially adhered to this school of thought. In his pamphlet Serio e faceto sulla giurisprudenza (Serious and Facetious on Jurisprudence), Jhering mocked the jurisprudence of concepts (a term he coined), stating that with the historical school and pandectism, they had "ended up building an abstract and ahistorical position for law." The very practitioners of the interpretation of legal norms had realized how difficult it was to adapt normative provisions, conceived years earlier, to a different social and political context, thus practically denying the dogma of norms. Thus, at the turn of the century, a movement of opposition to formalism began, which held that law was not only a theoretical construct based on the imperativeness of norms but that it "reflected the concrete, historical reality of society and followed its evolution".

Jhering himself, after distancing from formalism, spoke of a "jurisprudence of interests", still positivist but closer to concrete reality, asserting that "the creator of all law is the purpose, and there is no legal position that does not owe its origin to a purpose, that is, to a practical reason", with the purpose being linked to a balanced assessment of human life's needs and the interests of the parties. He outlined these theories in his work "The Purpose of Law". According to Philipp Heck, who was an adherent of this doctrine, the jurisprudence of interests surpasses the primacy of logic with "the primacy of studying and evaluating life". Heck also recognized the incompleteness of law, which was one of the pillars of positivism, granting judges the authority to go beyond the formal dictates of the law, without contradicting it, in the case of a loophole. Always surpassing the dogmatism of norms, Max von Rumelin observed that "judgments should be issued based on an assessment of the real interests at stake and not on dogmatic and abstract concepts and preconceptions". In France, dominated by the school of exegesis, François Gény had a profound influence, introducing the concept of free scientific research in the interpretation of positive law. A concrete application of antiformalist positions occurred in 1907 with the enactment of the Swiss Civil Code, whose Article 1 stipulated that, in the case of a gap, the judge could rely on custom or, if none existed, on the most authoritative doctrine or jurisprudence.

=== Code of canon law ===
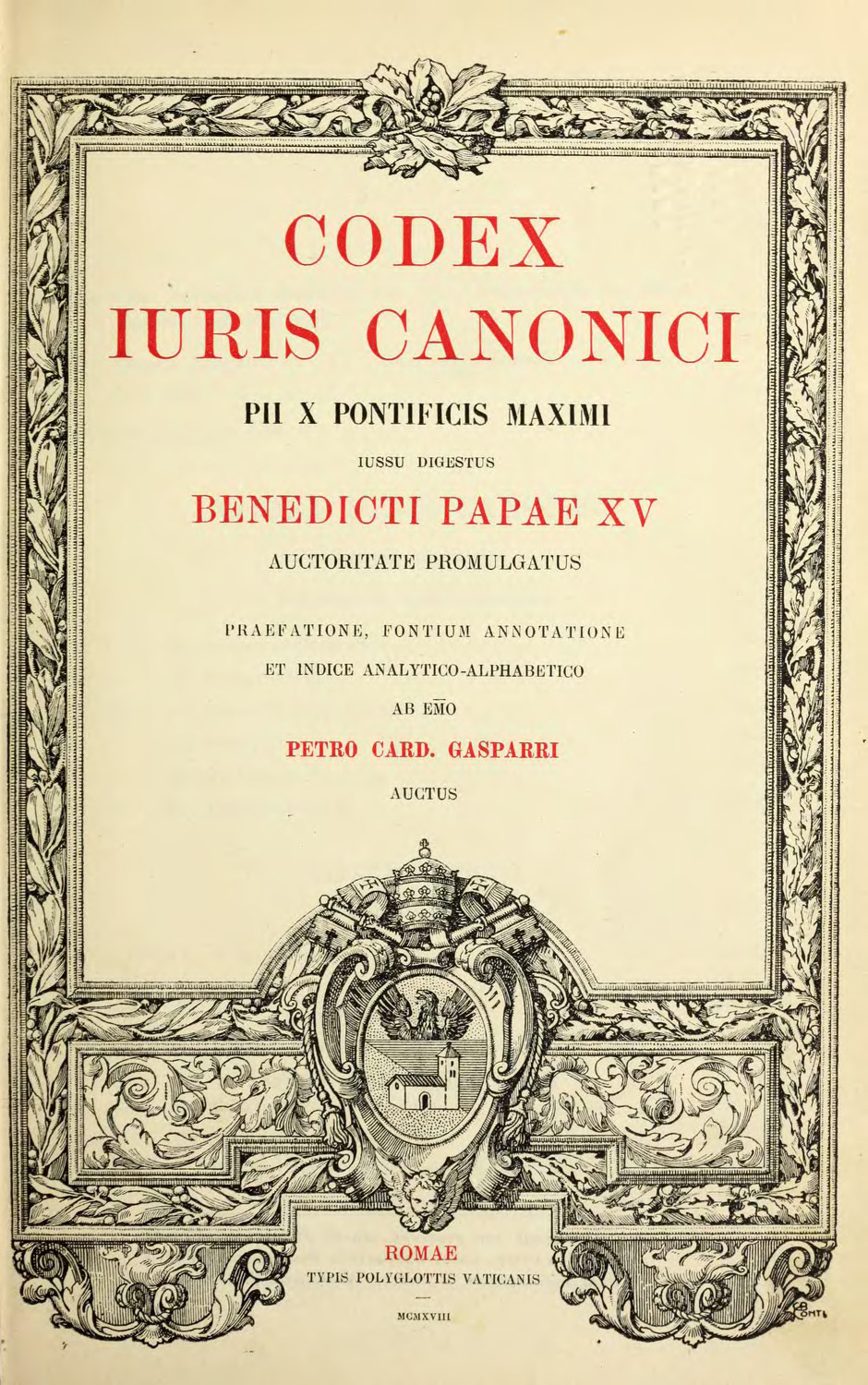
Title page of a 1917 edition of the Codex Iuris Canonici

Following the example of the Napoleonic code, a lively debate began within the Catholic Church about the need to proceed with the codification of its law. Supporters emphasized the necessity of making the law more coherent, as it was already afflicted by antinomies, while opponents viewed the codification of law as a subjugation to the Enlightenment and the Napoleonic conception, which went against the Church and seemed to undermine custom. The first official calls for codification were made during the First Vatican Council, convened in 1868, but the premature conclusion of the council in 1870, following the capture of Rome by the Kingdom of Italy, halted any official intentions, leaving only some space for private initiatives. The issue became relevant again with the election of Pope Pius X, who, in favor of modernizing the ecclesiastical structure and the Roman Curia, viewed the promulgation of a Code of Canon Law favorably.

With the motu proprio "Arduum sane munus", the task was entrusted to a pontifical commission led by Cardinal Pietro Gasparri. The work lasted nearly ten years, surviving Pope Pius X, who died in 1914; on Pentecost Day of 1917, Pope Benedict XV was able to promulgate, with the papal bull Providentissima Mater, the Pio-Benedictine Code, composed of brief and concise canons (2414 in total), which regulated the legal life of the Church. Liturgical matters, external public law, and the law of the Eastern Catholic Churches were excluded. Moreover, the code did not include the relations between the States and the Church, while abrogating all previous legislation, except for acquired rights, granted indults, and long-established or immemorial customs. In the perspective of centralization, the Pontifical Commission for the Authentic Interpretation of the Code of Canon Law was also established, tasked with responding, under the pope's approval, to questions concerning the code.

== First postwar period ==
=== A season of constitutionalism ===
World War I ended with the harsh defeat of the Central Powers and the collapse of their respective monarchies (the Habsburgs in Austria and the Hohenzollerns in Germany), which were replaced by democratic systems with constitutions. This process also affected regions that were under German Empire control, although they were not formally part of it. This was the case, for example, in Finland, which became independent in 1917 and adopted a constitutional charter two years later, becoming a semi-presidential republic. The situation was more complex for the other regions, starting with the charter introduced in Germany to address the chaos caused by the power vacuum following the abdication of Wilhelm II.

==== Weimar constitution ====
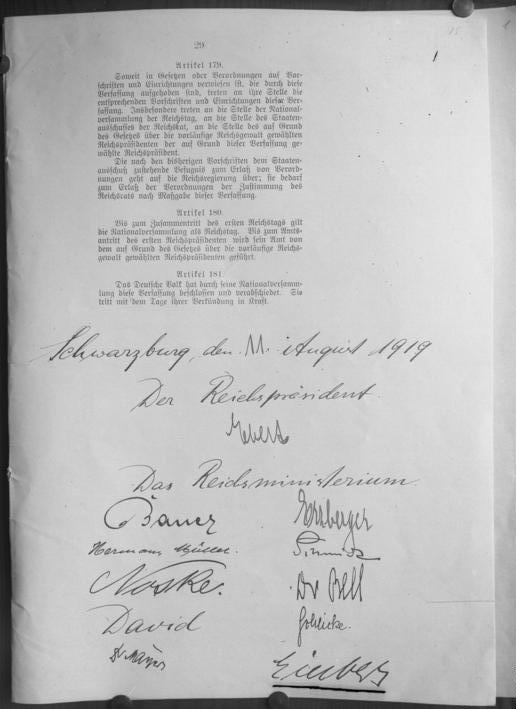
Final page of the Constitution with the signatures of President Ebert and the members of Gustav Bauer's government.

In 1919, the German National Constituent Assembly approved the Constitution of the German Reich (a period best known as the Weimar Republic) on August 11 (known as the "Weimar Constitution" after the city where it was drafted), replacing the previous Bismarckian-era Constitution of the German Empire. With it, a "deep democratization of the German state" was achieved, establishing a semi-presidential republic supported by a proportional representation system with universal suffrage, including the right to vote for women. Additionally, the head of state was directly elected by the people. The Weimar Constitution is particularly remembered for being the first to recognize and guarantee a wide range of social rights for its citizens, with the state required to work actively toward their realization. Among the protected rights were those related to education, housing, employment, health, an insurance system for old age and accidents, and maternity protection. Economically, it was expected that the state would "strive to guarantee everyone a humanly dignified existence", with particular attention to the middle class, for which "the state must promote, through its legislative and administrative activity, development ... and protect it from excessive taxation". Another innovation was the protection and enhancement of intellectual work, copyright, inventions, and the arts, defined in Article 158, a provision that contributed to the dynamic cultural life that characterized the years of the Republic.

With its systematic listing of principles and values, the Weimar Constitution "was no longer the mirror of a state, a bureaucracy, but of an entire society", representing "the first constitutional experiment in which a complex and complete constitutional model takes shape and a second age of constitutionalism begins, to which many current 'charters' belong." The framework outlined in Weimar provided the German Reich with a certain stability until the great depression of 1929, which undermined both the achievement of social objectives and the functioning of institutions. The severe internal tensions within society, due to extreme hyperinflation and unemployment, led to the emergence of new "anti-system" political formations and a consequent political fragmentation that made the country practically ungovernable. In this context, and exploiting the "flexibility" of the Constitution, the Nazi Party led by Adolf Hitler managed to seize power in 1933 and, shortly thereafter, establish a regime in which the Weimar Constitution ceased to be applied, though it was never formally abolished.

==== Crisis of constitutions ====
The crisis of the Weimar Constitution was not an isolated incident: other constitutions had generated excessive multipartism, which in turn contributed to the formation of unstable governments, followed by political figures who concentrated power in their own hands, overthrowing the previous structure. Similar cases occurred, for example, in Poland, where the March Constitution, adopted on March 17, 1921, did not prevent the May Coup of 1926, which led to the authoritarian Sanacja government led by Józef Piłsudski. After the counterrevolution of 1918–1920, Hungary returned to being a constitutional monarchy; however, on March 1, 1920, the army and paramilitary units occupied the Budapest parliament building, imposing Miklós Horthy as regent.

In 1922, Lithuania adopted its own constitution but the subsequent instability led to the 1926 coup, resulting in the establishment of an authoritarian regime by Antanas Smetona. Similarly, in 1934, Konstantin Päts amended the constitutional charter of Estonia, inaugurating a regime of strict presidential authoritarianism. In the same year, in Latvia, Prime Minister Kārlis Ulmanis dissolved the Saeima (Latvian parliament), establishing a fully controlled non-parliamentary authoritarian regime in which political parties were abolished, part of the 1922 Constitution was suspended, and civil liberties were restricted. After 1933 and until 1938, Czechoslovakia remained the only functioning democracy in Eastern Europe, as all other Eastern states coexisted, as mentioned, with authoritarian or autocratic regimes.

=== Legal thought in the early 20th century ===
==== Reaction to positivism, neo-Kantianism, and neo-Hegelianism ====
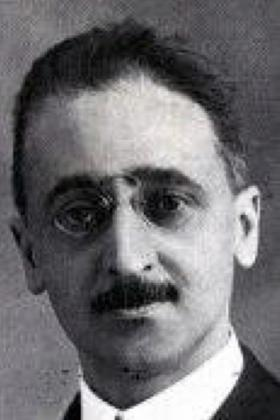
Giorgio Del Vecchio's thought had a great influence not only in Italy.

The early 20th century was characterized by a strong reaction to 19th-century positivism, already initiated by the antiformalists, which manifested in various schools of thought, but all shared the idea of "combating deterministic naturalism and the mechanism of positivism", as they were accused of limiting the spiritual freedoms of man. Rudolf Stammler was among the first to belong to the neo-Kantian school to present his theory of legal science, aiming to combine the ethical analysis of law with the recognition of its precise scientific nature. For Stammler, the concept of law had to be sought before the experience of law itself, in its pure form, to construct a legal science. His formula of "natural law with a variable content" helped recover some of the natural law theories, which had fallen out of favor due to accusations of historicism. Other legal philosophers responded to positivism from Neo-Hegelian positions, such as Adolf Lasson, Josef Kohler, Erich Kaufmann, and Julius Binder, among others.

In Italy, legal positivism faced a crisis mainly due to the work of Giorgio Del Vecchio, whose work helped rehabilitate, not only in his homeland, the study of legal philosophy, which was at the time discredited. He focused intensely on the ethical aspects of law, emphasizing how not everything legal is necessarily "just", as in the case of slavery, thus attempting to demonstrate that the idea of purely formal justice is not compatible with the needs of man, which are also made of immaterial values. Adolfo Ravà also worked on the ethics of law, distinguishing it, following the Kantian approach, from morality by reducing it to a technical norm. However, his proposal was not that of mere technicalism; for Ravà, the purpose of law could find its ethics in that of the society of which it is an expression.

==== Hans Kelsen and normativism ====
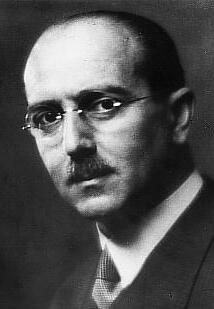
Hans Kelsen

Despite the crisis it was facing, the doctrine of legal formalism did not disappear; rather, it provided the opportunity to recognize the need for improvements that would allow it to dispel any doubts about its scientific nature. This was mainly achieved thanks to the work of Hans Kelsen, the most important representative of legal normativism in the 20th century. A professor of law between 1917 and 1973 at the universities of Vienna, Cologne, Geneva, Prague, Harvard (where he had arrived to escape Nazi persecution as a Jew), and Berkeley, Kelsen himself defined his theory as "pure" because "it seeks to ensure a knowledge directed solely at the law and because it seeks to eliminate from this knowledge anything that does not belong to the object precisely defined as law", thus bringing jurisprudence "to the level of an authentic science, a science of the spirit."

In his conception of the norm, Kelsen spoke of "hypothetical judgments" rather than commands, as it can be summarized in an attempt to formulate a causality between an event (illegal act) and a sanction according to the will of the State. Therefore, the judgment on a case is based on a legal norm that attributes to a predetermined condition as illegal a consequence, which is the prescribed sanction. In this way, a "reversal of the traditional doctrine" is achieved, as the illegal act is not illegal because it is inherently so, nor because, but because a sanction is "imputed" to it, that is, it is logically connected to it.

Having defined the centrality of the norm in law, Kelsen introduced the hierarchical structure of the legal system: if a norm prescribes a certain sanction, there must be a norm that authorizes a court to impose it, and in turn, there will be a higher norm that grants the authority to an organ to issue the previous norm. Thus, a "staircase" system in which each norm derives from a higher norm in a process that ends with the ultimate "fundamental norm" (Grundnorm), which, in Kelsen's view, is not posited but "presupposed" as a "fact-producing norm" and identified in the constitution approved by the assembly of the members. Regarding constitutionalism, Kelsen was a prolific author of concepts, attributing to Parliament the central role in the constitutional system and being one of the first to conceive of the theory of constitutional jurisdiction(entrusted to a constitutional court) as the "guardian of the constitution."

==== Institutionalism ====
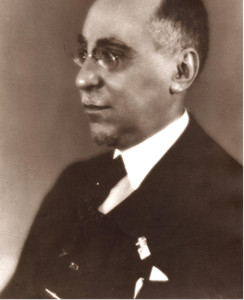
Santi Romano

Opposite to Kelsen, in Italy, the jurist Santi Romano developed the doctrine of institutionalism based on a "legal formalism centered on the concept of institution", which he theorized in 1917. While Kelsen started from the norm to reach the legal order, Romano wrote that law "before being a norm, is organization, structure, and the position of the very society in which it takes place and that it constitutes as a unity, as an entity in itself." However, Romano did not precisely define the institution, initially limiting it to coinciding with social bodies or entities and later excluding that the legal phenomenon could be identified in all forms of human coexistence. The lack of a clear boundary to identify what Romano meant by "institution" led to some criticism, to which he responded by outlining some characteristics that it should possess, such as effectiveness, concreteness, and objectivity. Despite this gap, the scholar noted that institutionalism had "effectively acted to shake the dogma of the statehood of law, ... strengthening in turn the principle of the plurality of legal systems."

Romano's doctrine remained confined to Italy, but in France, similar currents formed independently. Among the most important examples, Georges Gurvitch theorized legal pluralism, starting from the fact that human communities can generate their law through normative facts, according to their needs and for their existence. Gurvitch also excluded, however, the legality of every normative fact.

=== Law in totalitarian states ===
In the first half of the 20th century, some states established regimes known as totalitarian, which extremized certain ideologies already present in the previous century and mobilized entire populations around the power of a single party or one person, with dramatic results. These were the cases of the Soviet Union, Fascist Italy, and Nazi Germany.

==== Soviet Union ====
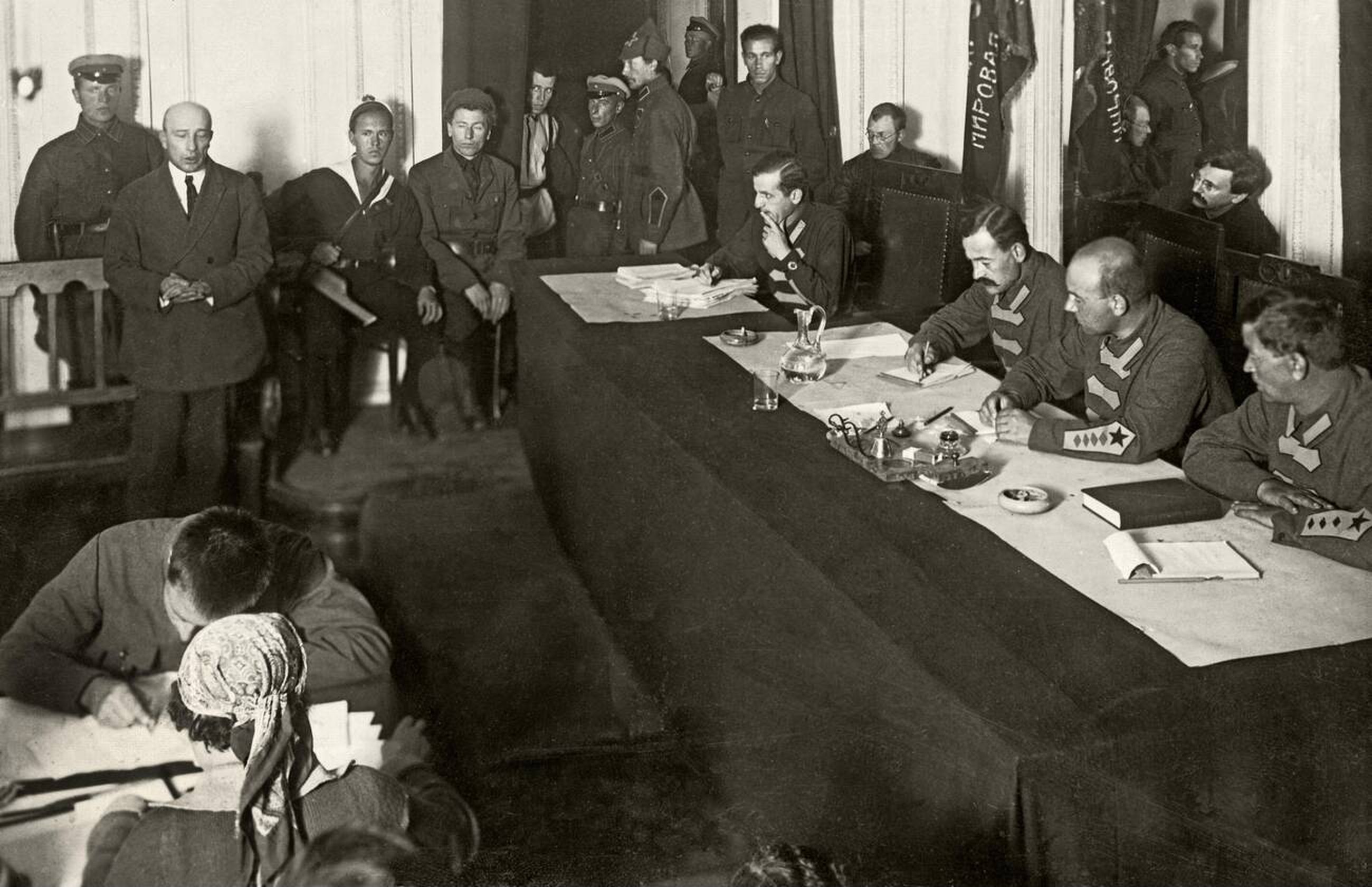
Trial against Boris Savinkov in 1926 in the Soviet Union

The Russian Civil War, which began in 1917, ended with the establishment of the Soviet Union in 1922, the first concrete example of the application of Marxist theories in a state. Years earlier, Friedrich Engels had theorized the disappearance of law as an expression of society once communism was established, inbyarx's classification of law as a superstructure. Despite these premises, when Lenin found himself at the head of the Soviet government, he had to admit that it was impossible for people to immediately do without law, as it was considered "necessary to maintain the most rigorous revolutionary order, it is necessary to strictly observe the laws and prescriptions of the Soviet state and to ensure that everyone applies them." Many Soviet jurists of that time justified this by arguing that they were in a transitional period, in which the use of law was still necessary, but with the perfection of the communist society, this would be overcome. Among those who theorized the first Soviet law were Pëtr Ivanovič Stučka, Michail Andreevič Rejsner, and, above all, Evgenij Bronislavovič Pašukanis, who developed the principle of the correspondence of ends, a foundational element of Soviet law.

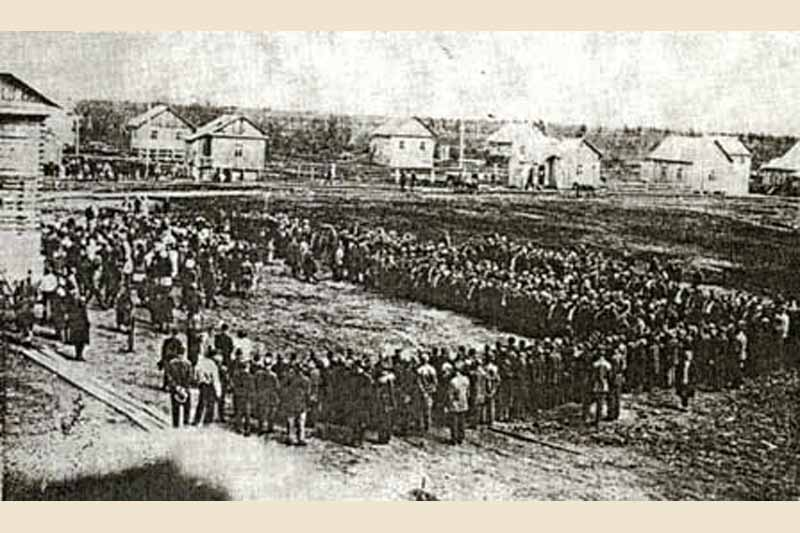
View of the Jagrinskij corrective labor camp, near Severodvinsk.

With the rise to power of Joseph Stalin in 1924, a true dictatorial regime was established, whose ideology is known as Stalinism. Law, which had not yet been surpassed, (Note: Stalin promulgated the 1936 Constitution of the Soviet Union, replacing the 1918 Constitution of Soviet Russia, with characters very similar to those of bourgeois countries.) became a political tool in the hands of Stalin and his most powerful jurist, Andrey Vyshinsky. Considering law as the "will of the Soviet people" and based on Stalin's thesis that "the extinction of the state will occur through its maximum strengthening", the regime justified authoritarianism and its crimes. The 1922 Penal Code disregarded the principle of legality, considering as a crime "anything deemed offensive to the Soviet regime and the legal order established by the government of workers and peasants". With Article 58 of the 1927 edition of the code, "counter-revolutionary activities" were punished. Judges were formally elected but appointed by the Party; penalties were often imposed at the discretion of the authorities and, in many cases, involved confinement in the Gulag system.

==== Fascist Italy ====
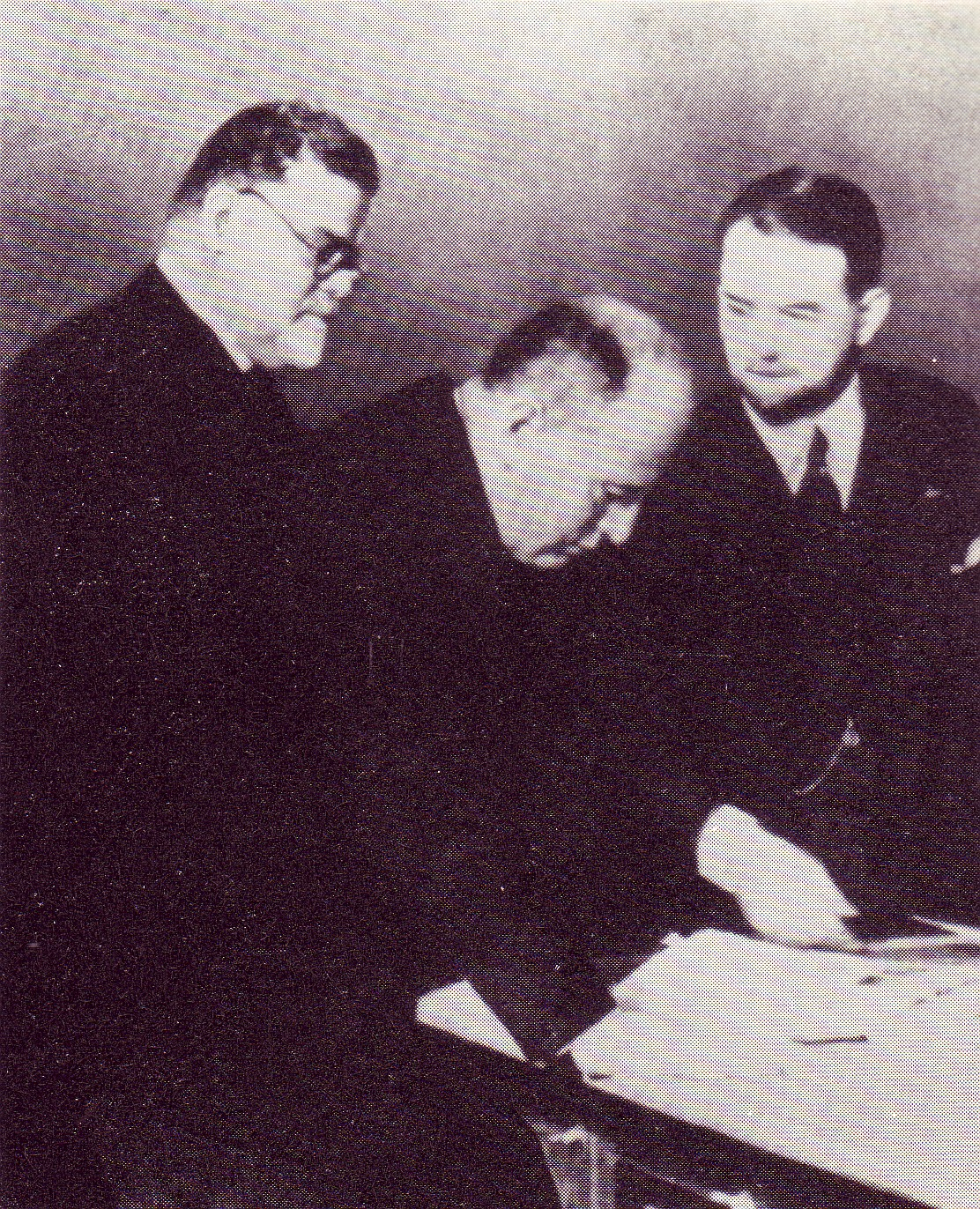
Giovanni Gentile and Benito Mussolini while examining the first volumes of the Enciclopedia Italiana.

When the fascist movement began to take its first steps in Italy, it lacked a well-defined ideology. Only after gaining power in 1922, it begin to develop a doctrine, particularly through the work of Giovanni Gentile. From a theoretical point of view, the topic of law was never particularly addressed; the Italian fascist regime did not radically overturn the existing legal system but instead modified it from within to serve its goals, thus operating within an apparent legality. With the authoritarian "fascist laws" enacted between 1925 and 1926, freedom of the press and association were limited (although not entirely formally suppressed), unions unrelated to the fascist party were abolished, mayors of cities were replaced by non-elected Podestà, and public safety laws were tightened. Power was thus centralized in the National Fascist Party, particularly in the person of Benito Mussolini, who assumed the new position of Head of Government, Prime Minister, and Secretary of State with, in practice, unlimited authority. The establishment of the Special Court for the Defense of the State was used to suppress any dissent. The 1927 Charter of Labor put into practice the principles of fascist economic policy, largely based on corporatism.

With all these laws, the principle of equality among citizens effectively disappeared, favoring those aligned with the system—and thus the fascist ideology—at the expense of those who did not adhere to it. Additionally, the interests of the individual were diminished (anti-individualism) in favor of a legal system that prioritized national interest, interpreted by the "most worthy and most suited" men. With the fascist racial laws promulgated in 1938, described by Paolo Grossi as "a disgrace to Italian legal civilization", the legal drift of fascism reached its peak.

All of this was strongly criticized by the philosopher Benedetto Croce, one of the most ardent opponents who, despite sharing with Gentile the title of father of Italian idealism, distanced himself after the assassination of Giacomo Matteotti. The dispute between the two, whose echoes continued even in the decades after the fall of fascism, reached its peak in 1925 with Croce's publication of the Manifesto of the Anti-Fascist Intellectuals, in response to Gentile's Manifesto of Fascist Intellectuals.

With the Royal Decree of March 16, 1942, a new civil code was promulgated to replace the Pisanelli Code of 1865, thus completing a project that had been conceived as early as 1923. Legal scholars with academic backgrounds contributed to its drafting, succeeding in creating, compared to other codes of the time, a "much more harmonious and rational overall architecture." Composed of 2969 articles divided into six books, it unified civil law with commercial law, which had previously been regulated by a separate code. Partially inspired by the Bürgerliches Gesetzbuch and doctrinal developments of the previous decades, it is still in force in the Italian Republic as of 2024, though diminished in some fascist-origin institutions, such as corporatism.

==== Nazi Germany ====
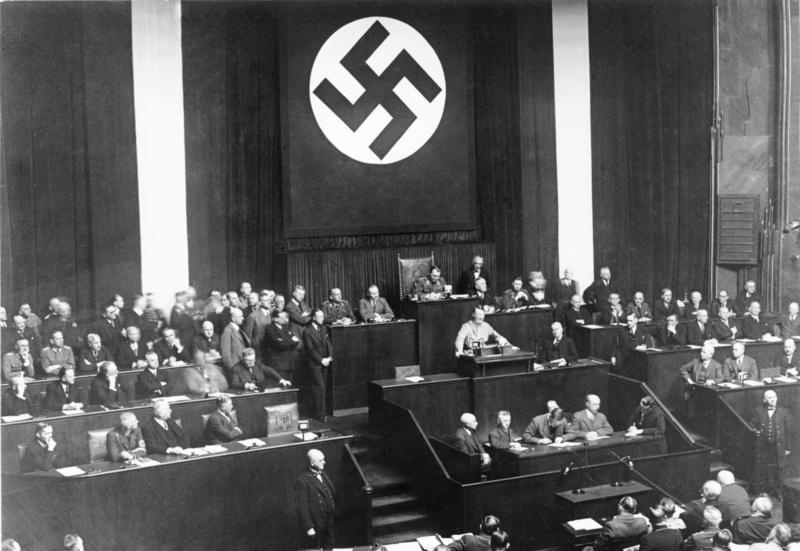
Hitler's Speech for the Promotion of the Enabling Act

The Reichstag fire on February 27, 1933, served as a pretext for a decree that, by Article 48 of the Weimar Constitution, declared a state of emergency and granted the president broad powers, including the suspension of civil rights in Germany. With the subsequent Enabling Act granting full powers to the Reich government, led by Hitler, it was allowed to legislate even against the constitution itself. (Note: Article 1 of the Full Powers Decree read "Laws enacted by the Reich Government may derogate from the Reich Constitution, provided they do not prejudice the institutions of the Reichstag and Reichsrat. The rights of the President remain unaffected.") This meant that the dictatorship was absolute, with power concentrated in the hands of one man, without any institutional balance. In Nazi Germany, the law was interpreted as a tool not for the state but for the "community of the people", led by a Führer assisted by a party. The principle of legality was expressly abolished when any act contrary to "the healthy sentiment of the people" was considered a crime. The judge was called to interpret the community of the German people according to Hitler's directives, who embodied its spirit. This community was based on the principles of blood and race in a vision of the supposed superiority of the Aryan race, justifying the military and civil subjugation of other peoples. For the individual, stripped of any inherent rights, only rights in service to the community's goals were conceived.

Many German jurists of the time supported this view, including Julius Binder, Karl Larenz, and Carl Schmitt. The latter is considered one of the most important theorists of Nazism and the father of the doctrine known as "decisionism". Racial policy in Nazi Germany was institutionalized with the promulgation of the Nuremberg Laws in 1935 and the opening of concentration camps. The "Final Solution to the Jewish Question", which led to the Holocaust, was carried out by executing a simple verbal order secretly given by Hitler himself.

== Post-World War II period ==
=== New constitutions, new codes, and new rights ===
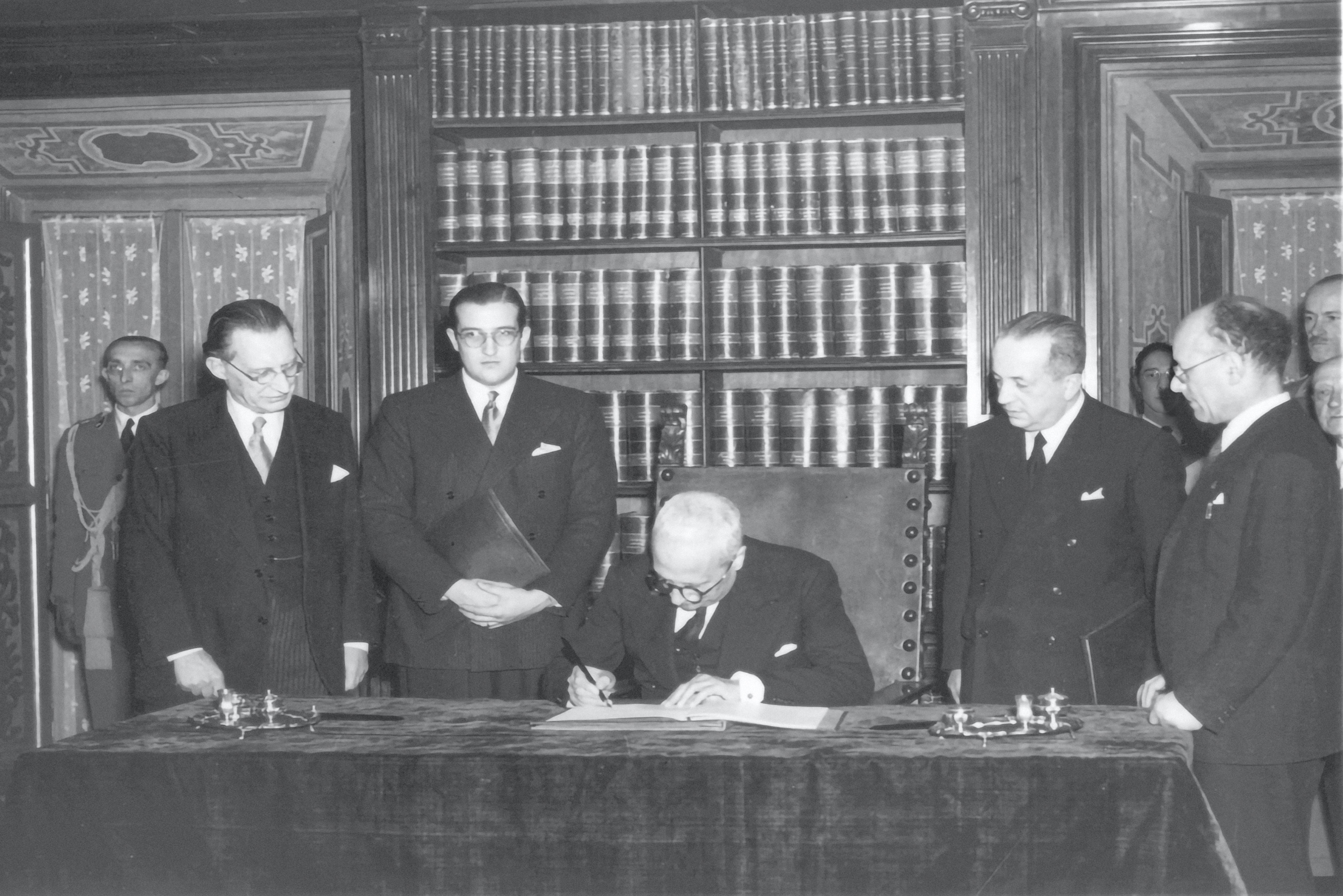
Enrico De Nicola signed the Italian Constitution on December 27, 1947. Born from the tragic fascist experience, it is an example of a rigid, voted, compromising, democratic, and programmatic constitution, and its fundamental principles cannot be subject to revision.

The legislative aberrations produced by totalitarian regimes called into question the state's prerogative to create laws without any limits. Thus, in the aftermath of World War II, the model of the constitutional state began to take hold, where, as summarized by Gustavo Zagrebelsky, "fundamental rights and individual freedoms are detached from the law, which cannot be modified or even repealed by ordinary laws." The new constitutions of countries that had experienced the dreadful consequences of totalitarianism became "rigid", requiring complex procedures and qualified majorities for their amendment, with fundamental principles even considered unchangeable. Furthermore, they listed various programmatic principles to guide lawmakers and judges in pursuing the numerous interests deemed worthy of protection. This was the case with the 1948 Constitution of the Italian Republic and the following year's Basic Law of the Federal Republic of Germany, while Japan adopted such a constitution as early as 1947, during the Allied occupation of the country.

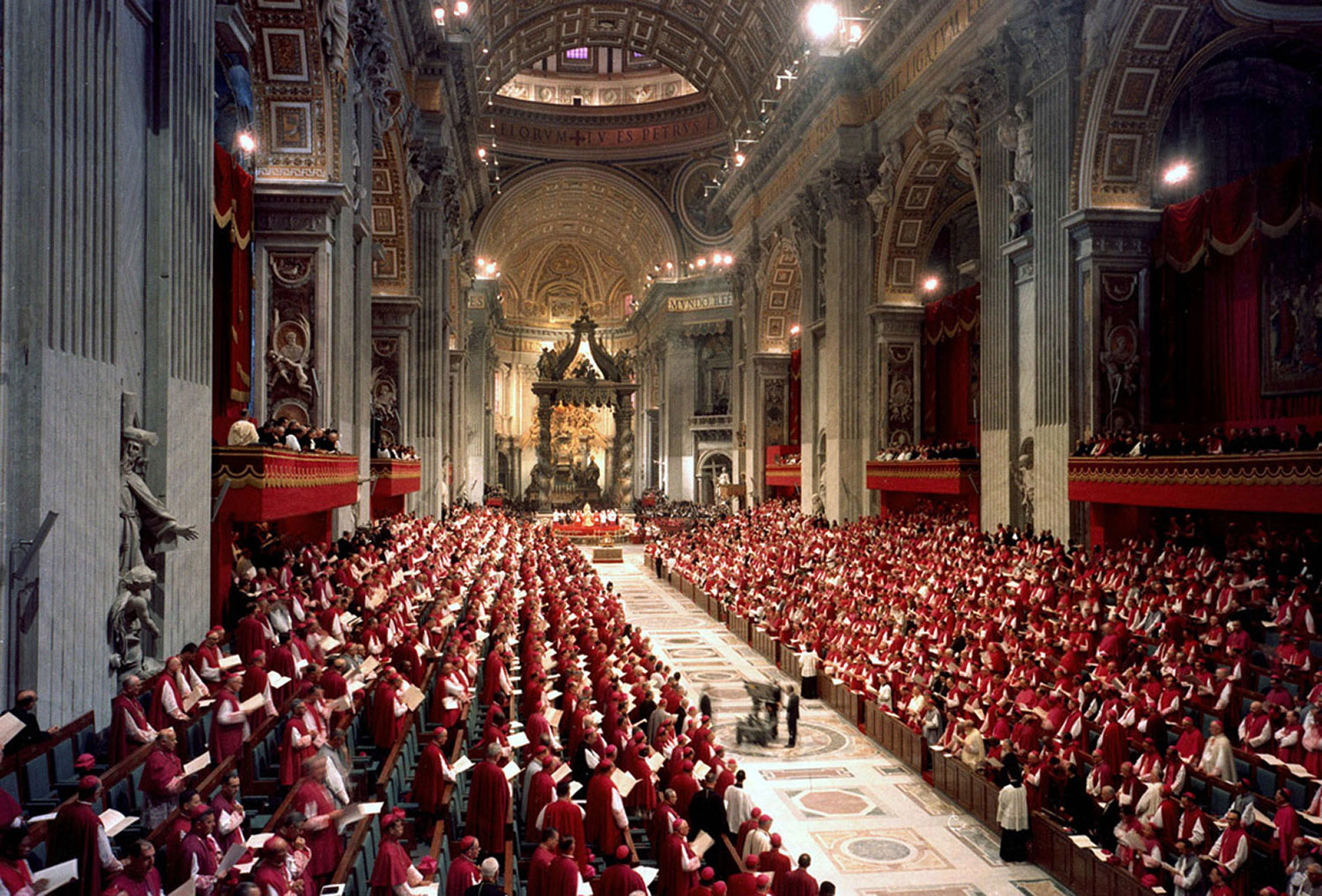
The results of the Second Vatican Council led to a new Code of Canon Law.

The weakening of the legislative power of the state was manifested through the return to a plurality of normative sources originating from international and supranational organizations, from custom, from doctrine, or from other entities internal to the state itself. Despite this, in the countries that had already adopted it, the instrument of the code was not abandoned; on the contrary, in the post-war period, codification activity was particularly lively. In 1992, the Netherlands adopted a new civil code considered by many jurists to be one of the most innovative, while three years earlier, Italy had introduced a new code of criminal procedure largely based on an accusatorial system. In 1983, the Catholic Church replaced the Pio-Benedictine Code with a new Code of Canon Law to implement the doctrinal, pastoral, and liturgical innovations introduced by the Second Vatican Council. Alongside the openness to ecumenism, the new code emphasized the role of the laity, aequitas canonica, the matrimonial bond, and the discipline of the sacraments.

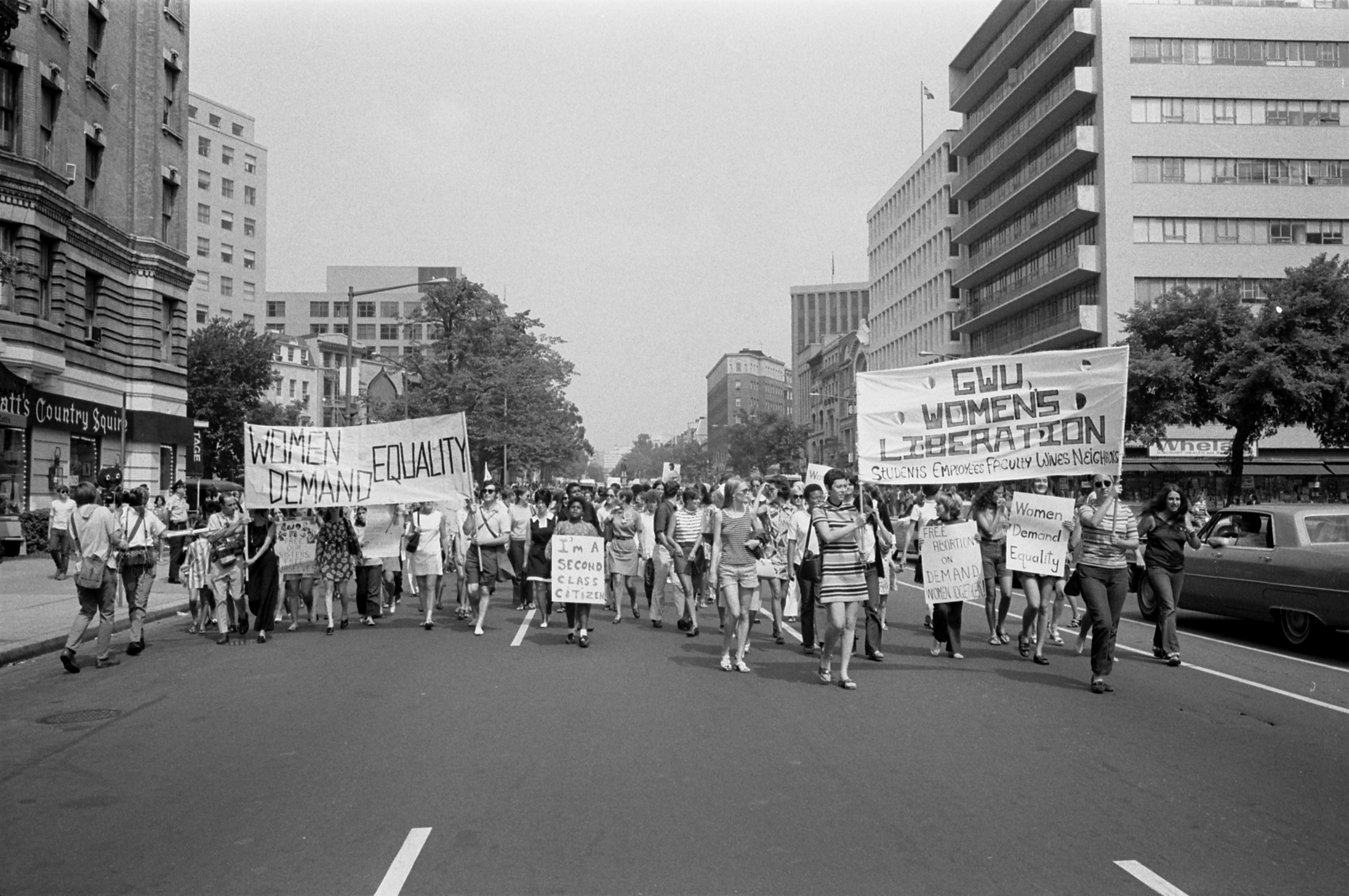
Feminist demonstration in Washington in 1970

The rapid societal changes that characterized the second half of the 20th century had significant repercussions in the field of law, particularly in family law and in the legal status of women. By the late 1950s, nearly all European states had recognized women's suffrage and granted women full legal capacity. In the following decades, divorce was introduced in countries where it was still prohibited, and parental responsibility for children was equalized between mothers and fathers, moving beyond the traditional concept of paternal authority. The decriminalization of adultery also became common in many legal systems, as did the introduction of abortion laws allowing women autonomous choice regarding pregnancy. Numerous legal reforms also addressed de facto unions, assisted reproduction, same-sex unions, and organ donations. Legislators have often also focused on the protection of the environment, health, landscape, and cultural heritage. In this context, philosopher and jurist Norberto Bobbio would come to describe this period as the "age of rights."

=== Birth and formation of the European Union ===
The millions of deaths on the European battlefields inspired in many the idea of a united Europe—an idea that had been contemplated for centuries. The turning point came in 1950 with the Schuman Declaration, which materialized the following year with the founding of the European Coal and Steel Community, joined by France, Germany, Italy, Belgium, the Netherlands, and Luxembourg. A first setback occurred in 1954 when the French National Assembly rejected the proposal for a future federal Europe that would take on defense and foreign policy responsibilities, although it accepted the pursuit of economic union. Thus, with the Treaties of Rome in 1958, the European Economic Community (EEC) was established, aiming to facilitate trade exchanges among the signatories. The treaty—primarily the result of the work of Jean Monnet, Gaetano Martino, and Paul-Henri Spaak—would later serve as a "functionalist" model for the path of European integration.

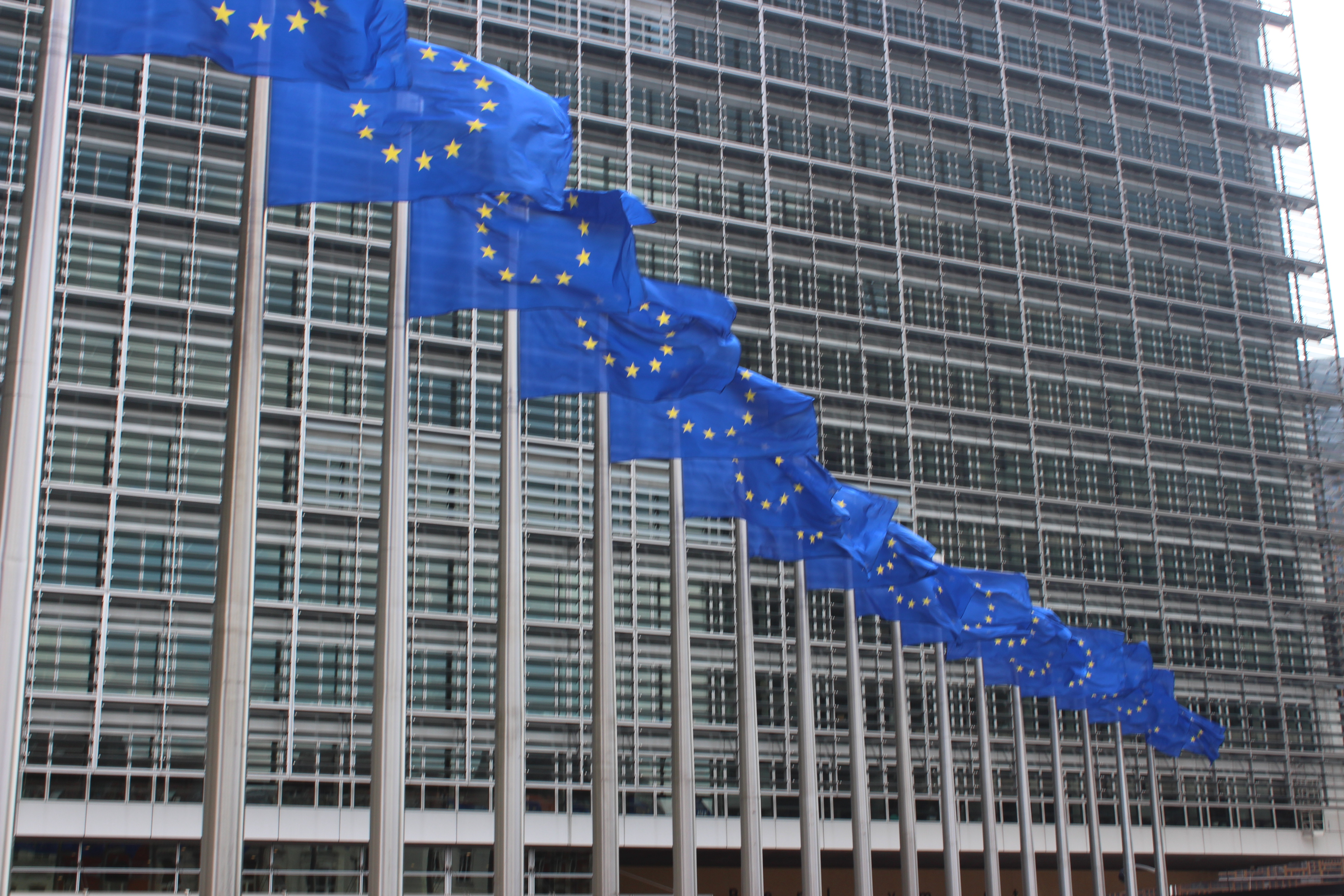
European flags in front of the Berlaymont building, headquarters of the Commission

At the foundation of the EEC were four institutions: the European Commission, the Special Council of Ministers, the European Parliament, and the Court of Justice of the European Union; the jurisprudence of the latter "would become milestones in the development of European Union Law", while the Parliament would be the body to evolve the most, becoming elective in 1976 and, three years later, by universal suffrage, to enjoy "a higher institutional legitimacy."

In 1992, with the Maastricht Treaty, monetary union was introduced with the creation of the European Central Bank (ECB) and the birth of the euro. In the following years, further treaties expanded the EEC's competencies as more States joined. The Treaty of Nice established certain procedures in anticipation of further nations joining the Union. The subsequent failure to draft a European Constitution, following rejection by some Member States, did not halt the process of integration, and with the Treaty of Lisbon — signed in 2007 and entering into force on January 1, 2009 – numerous innovations were introduced, including the recognition of the Union's legal personality, the dismantling of the three-pillar structure, the introduction of a tool for direct democracy, the establishment of the High Representative of the Union for Foreign Affairs and Security Policy, the expansion of the powers of the European Parliament, and the Presidency of the Council of the European Union.

=== Legal thought in the second half of the 20th century ===
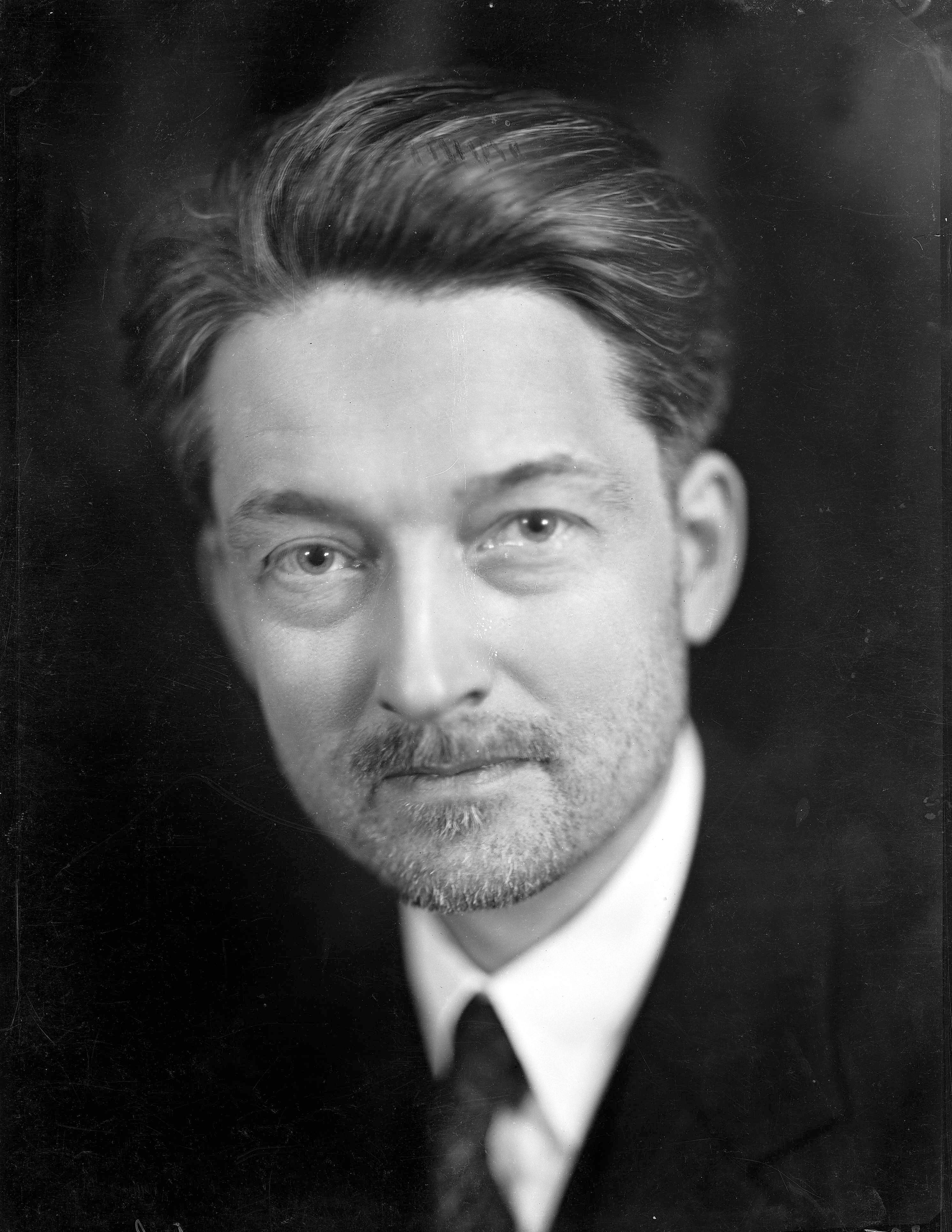
The French philosopher Jacques Maritain, belonging to neo-Thomism, was among the supporters of a rediscovery of natural law.

It became clear how dangerous it was to conceive of positive law as the sole and absolute legal expression. Starting from the 1950s, there was a return to natural law, but it was no longer seen as an "immutable order" but rather as values that are "progressively discovered" by man about specific situations or relationships. Thus, the concept of "relative natural law" emerged, which combines historicism and law rooted in nature, meaning not only eternal and immutable norms but also ones embedded in the given historical context. This was a necessity aimed at safeguarding individual freedoms and the rights of minorities, which could be jeopardized by a law reduced to mere norms established by the will of the legislator. Moreover, according to its supporters, this conception of law was better suited to addressing the rapid transformations of society, which state legislation often failed to keep pace with. Thus, in the words of the Austrian Arthur Kaufmann, "natural law and the historicity of law are not mutually enemies; rather, the historicity of law means the openness of law toward natural law insofar as ... what is achieved is what is possible in a given place and time: the historically just law." In Italy, Giorgio Del Vecchio, along the same lines, called in 1947 for "the return to the eternal idea of natural law."

However, the reconsideration of natural law was not exclusive to countries that had experienced the extremes of legal positivism; for example, in France, Michel Villey and Jacques Maritain proposed a natural law doctrine inspired by the ideas of Saint Thomas Aquinas, while Jacques Ellul conceived it in a Protestant framework. Other exponents of this current included, among others, the Belgians Jacques Leclercq, Odon Lottin, and Jean Dabin, and the Spaniards Enrique Luño Peña, Luis Legaz Lacambra, Francisco Puy Muñoz, and José Corts Grau.

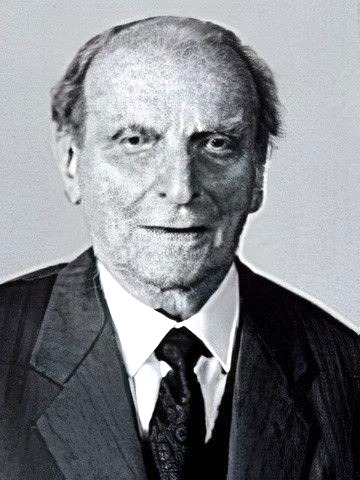
Norberto Bobbio

The questioning of positivism was accompanied by an "overcoming of the rigid distinction between law and morality", which had its effects especially in constitutional law with the introduction, alongside positive rules, of fundamental principles. As a result, judges and legislators increasingly found themselves obliged to balance various interests worthy of protection in their decisions, some of which also had ethical content. Thus, there was a recognition of the need to incorporate ethical elements into the law: this gave rise to "inclusive legal positivism", of which the American Jules Coleman is one of the leading exponents. The anti-positivist Ronald Dworkin did not rule out the possibility that a judge might resort to principles of an essentially ethical nature when needed to resolve a gap, as they nonetheless form the "legitimating substratum" of positive norms.

The post-World War II period also saw the traditional model of legal reasoning being called into question in favor of new conceptions of legal logic, which would later lead to the development of legal informatics. The approach of this discipline remained tied to logical formalism, but new methodological tools were introduced to overcome the shortcomings of previous models. In Italy, Norberto Bobbio was one of the first, in an essay published in 1950, to discuss the topic of legal language, proposing a scientific approach achievable through "the tools of a rigorous analysis of the legislator's discourse." In Belgium, Chaim Perelman, drawing on the ancient Platonic art of persuasion, made a significant contribution to the dialectics of legal reasoning.

=== Law in globalization ===
Flag of the United Nations

In the second half of the 20th century, law increasingly took on a global dimension, with some supranational and extranational entities becoming key players on the international stage. The outbreak of World War II had exposed the failure of the League of Nations; in 1945, the United States, Great Britain, the Soviet Union, and the Republic of China agreed on the objectives, structure, and functioning of the future organization that would replace it. On October 24, 1945, the United Nations officially began its work, with the goal, according to Article 1 of its charter, of "maintaining international peace and security." The experience of the Nuremberg trials (1945–1946), which judged crimes committed by the Nazis, paved the way for the development of international criminal law, aimed at ensuring the observance of human rights regardless of geographical or political boundaries. As of 2023, on two occasions, international criminal tribunals were established by the resolution of the United Nations Security Council to judge crimes committed in the former Yugoslavia (1993) and Rwanda (1994). Since July 1, 2002, the International Criminal Court has been operational, with jurisdiction over crimes of genocide, crimes against humanity, and war crimes. In 1959, the European Court of Human Rights was established in Strasbourg, with all members of the Council of Europe participating. In parallel, in the last decades of the 20th century, new rights considered fundamental for every individual were introduced, such as the right to privacy, to employment, to social security, to asylum, to freedom of worship, to nationality, and to enjoy adequate rest and a decent standard of living. Alongside human rights, environmental protection has also taken on an increasingly international perspective, with the Kyoto Protocol of 1997 (which entered into force in 2005) being the most significant example. The United Nations' 2030 Agenda commits nations globally to achieving sustainable development goals, while the Paris Agreement of 2015 is an international treaty aimed at reducing greenhouse gas emissions to limit global warming.

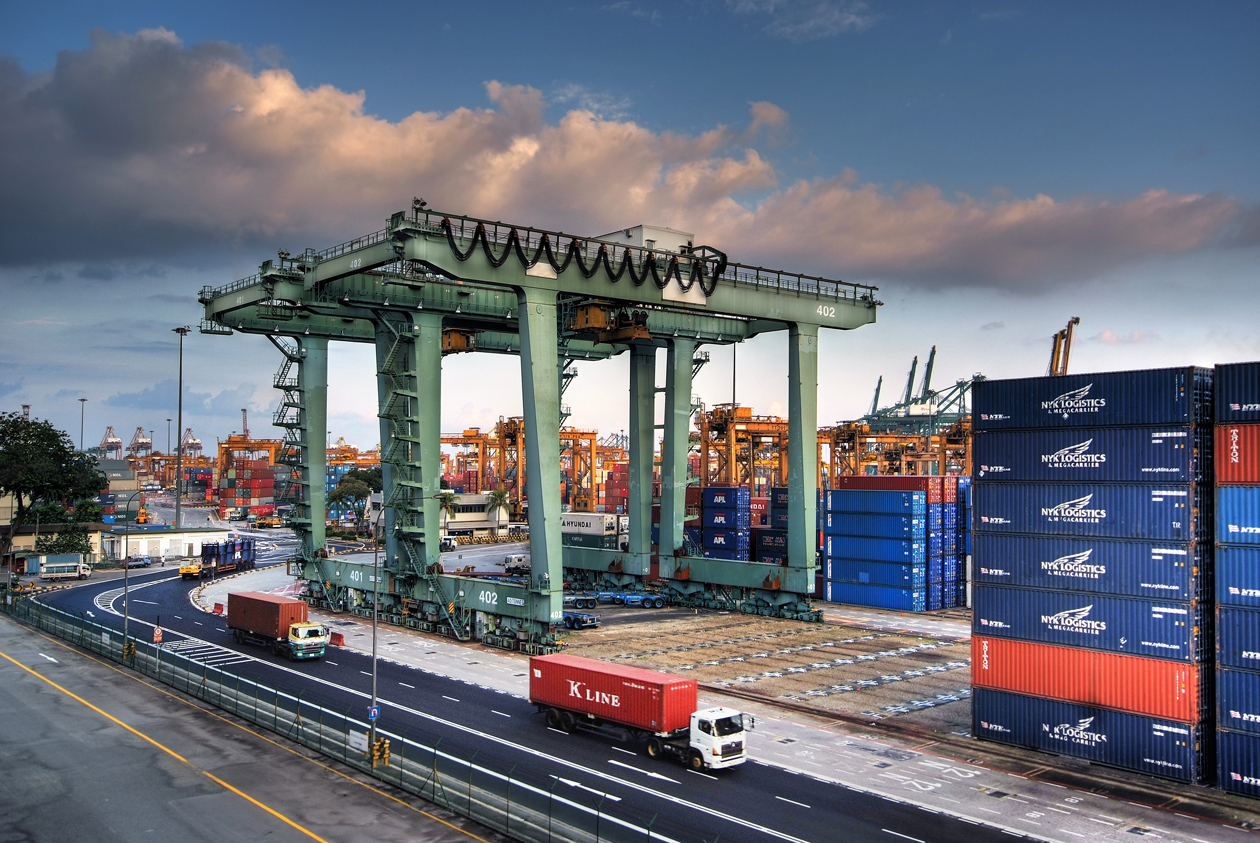
Container at the port of Singapore. The development of global trade has inevitably had repercussions on law.

The last decades of the 20th century witnessed such an intensification of international trade that the term "globalization" began to be widely used, a phenomenon driven by the dynamic U.S. model of free markets. In the legal field, this meant the export of certain American commercial legal instruments to nearly all parts of the world. As a result, many legal systems introduced new contractual models such as franchising, factoring, leasing, and many others. The regulatory and fiscal framework of each state increasingly became one of the key factors evaluated by multinational corporations when deciding where to invest. Regarding the resolution of disputes related to international trade, the use of international arbitration has become increasingly common, often with representation by major law firms, for reasons of speed and confidentiality. This has led to the formation of an arbitral jurisprudence that can be considered, in all respects, among the sources of law. Among the various institutions established to provide arbitration and conciliation services at an international level are the International Centre for Settlement of Investment Disputes, the International Tribunal for the Law of the Sea, the Permanent Court of Arbitration, and the Organization for Security and Co-operation in Europe. States, for their part, have over time reached international agreements on various matters, such as the recognition of negotiable instruments and the regulation of international sales.

=== Law and new technologies ===
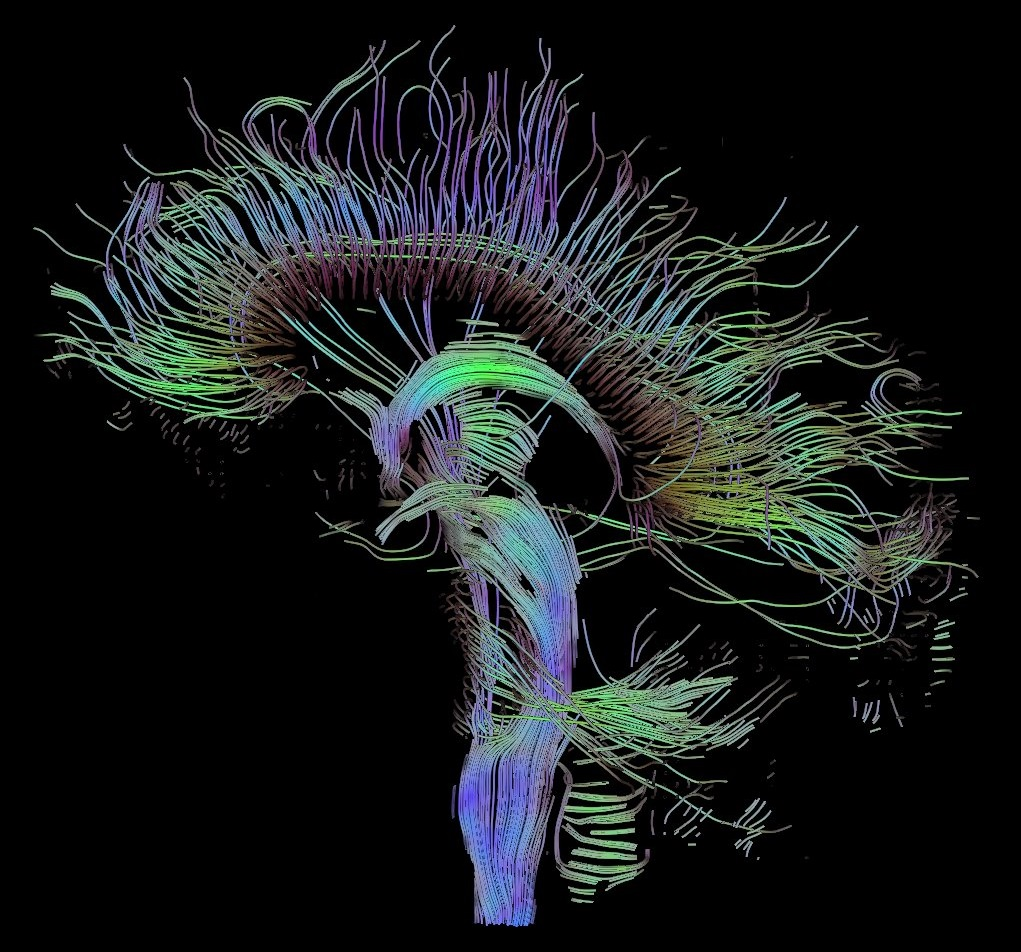
Tractographic reconstruction of neural connections. The development of technologies has opened bioethical scenarios that deeply involve the law.

The rapid technological evolution that characterized the second half of the 20th century, particularly the digital revolution, has profoundly impacted the practice of law, opening new perspectives. Computerization has transformed the work of jurists in research, archiving, transmission, and drafting of documents. The spread of the internet has revolutionized interactions between legal professionals, public administration, and citizens. Legal databases have become an indispensable tool for jurists. The idea of using electronic computers to solve legal problems did not yield concrete results until the 2010s, but subsequent advancements in artificial intelligence algorithms based on machine learning, neural networks, and big data analysis suggest potential future developments.

The development of biotechnology and medicine has raised ethical issues (bioethics) that the law cannot ignore. Genetic engineering, organ transplantation, the determination of brain death and resuscitation possibilities, cloning, genome manipulation, mandatory vaccinations, embryo protection, euthanasia, and environmental preservation are just some of the most pressing issues in 21st-century society, which require appropriate regulatory frameworks. The frequent multiculturalism found in many regions of the world makes it even more challenging to find solutions that inevitably may conflict with the ideas, religious beliefs, and moral values of parts of society. Balancing scientific progress, pluralism, and ethics will be one of the most significant challenges for jurists today and in the future.

== See also ==
- 1917 Code of Canon Law
- Conservative Order
- Labour law
- Late modern period
- Law
- Jurisprudence
- Jurisprudence of values
- Napoleonic Code
- Positivism

== Bibliography ==
- Abignente, Angelo; Ciaramelli, Fabio; Pomarici, Ulderico (2010). Validità, diritti, effettività: pagine di filosofia del diritto del Novecento [Validity, Rights, Effectiveness: Pages of 20th-Century Legal Philosophy]. Napoli: Editoriale Scientifica. ISBN 978-88-6342-161-3.
- Ascheri, Mario (2007). Introduzione storica al diritto moderno e contemporaneo [Historical Introduction to Modern and Contemporary Law]. Torino: Giappichelli. ISBN 978-88-348-8254-2.
- Bobbio, Norberto (2014). L'età dei diritti [The Age of Rights]. Torino: Einaudi. ISBN 978-88-06-22343-4.
- Alvazzi Del Frate, Paolo; Cavina, Marco; Ferrante, Riccardo; Sarti, Nicoletta; Solimano, Stefano; Speciale, Giuseppe; Tavilla, Elio (2018). Tempi del diritto [Times of Law]. Torino: Giappichelli. ISBN 978-88-921-1782-2.
- Banti, Alberto Mario (2009). L'età contemporanea: dalle rivoluzioni settecentesche all'imperialismo [The Contemporary Age: From 18th-Century Revolutions to Imperialism]. Roma: GLF Editori Laterza. ISBN 978-88-420-9143-1.
- Bin, Roberto; Pitruzzella, Giovanni (2007). Diritto Costituzionale [Constitutional Law] (8 ed.). Torino: Giappichelli Editore. ISBN 978-88-348-7650-3.
- Carinci, Franco; De Luca Tamajo, Raffaele; Tosi, Paolo; Treu, Tiziano (2011). Diritto del lavoro 2: Il rapporto di lavoro subordinato [Labor Law 2: The Employment Relationship]. Torino: UTET. ISBN 978-88-598-0518-2.
- Caroni, Pio; De Biasio, Giorgio (2004). Un inquieto ricercare [A Restless Search]. Bellinzona: Casagrande. ISBN 978-88-7713-415-8.
- Del Punta, Riccardo (2017). Diritto del lavoro [Labor Law] (9 ed.). Milano: Giuffrè. ISBN 978-88-14-22319-8.
- Fassò, Guido (2020) [1970]. Faralli, Carla (ed.). Ottocento e Novecento- Storia della filosofia del diritto [19th and 20th Centuries- History of the Philosophy of Law]. Vol. 3. Roma: Laterza. ISBN 978-88-593-0061-8.
- Ferrarese, Maria Rosaria (2012). Prima lezione di diritto globale [First Lesson in Global Law]. Roma: GLF Editori Laterza. ISBN 978-88-420-9860-7.
- Flores, Marcello (2008). Storia dei diritti umani [History of Human Rights]. Bologna: Il Mulino. ISBN 978-88-15-24002-6.
- Grossi, Paolo (2007). Mitologie giuridiche della modernità [Legal Mythologies of Modernity]. Milano: Giuffrè. ISBN 978-88-14-12863-9.
- Grossi, Paolo (2016). L'Europa del diritto [The Europe of Law]. Roma: Laterza. ISBN 978-88-581-2574-8.
- Sánchez, Guillermo Jiménez (2009) [1911]. Derecho Mercantil [Commercial Law] (in Spanish). Vol. 1. Barcelona: Ariel. ISBN 978-84-344-2672-6.
- Kelsen, Hans (1911). Hauptprobleme der Staatsrechtslehre: entwickelt aus der Lehre vom Rechtssatze [Main Problems of Constitutional Law: Developed from the Doctrine of Legal Propositions] (in German). Tübingen: Mohr.
- Nagy-Talavera, Nicholas (1970). The Green Shirts and the Others: A History of Fascism in Hungary and Rumania. Stanford: Hoover Institution Press. ISBN 978-0-8179-1851-4.
- Miletti, Marco Nicola (2015). Danovi, Filippo (ed.). Diritto e processo penale: storia di una dialettico tra antico e nuovo regime [Law and Criminal Procedure: History of a Dialectic Between Old and New Regimes]. Torino: Giappichelli. ISBN 978-88-348-5826-4.
- Musselli, Luciano (2007). Storia del diritto canonico. Introduzione alla storia del diritto e delle istituzioni ecclesiali [History of Canon Law: Introduction to the History of Law and Ecclesiastical Institutions] (2 ed.). Torino: G. Giappichelli. ISBN 978-88-348-7485-1.
- Padoa-Schioppa, Antonio (2007). Storia del diritto in Europa. Dal Medioevo all'età contemporanea [History of Law in Europe: From the Middle Ages to the Contemporary Era]. Bologna: Il Mulino. ISBN 978-88-15-11935-3.
- Pound, Roscoe (1946). Interpretations of Legal History. Cambridge: Harvard University Press.
- Sartor, Giovanni (2022). L'intelligenza artificiale e il diritto [Artificial Intelligence and Law]. Torino: Giappichelli. ISBN 978-88-921-4458-3.
- Sabbatucci, Giovanni; Vidotto, Vittorio (2019). Il mondo contemporaneo [The Contemporary World]. Roma: Laterza. ISBN 978-88-593-0042-7.
- Saraiva, José Hermano (2007). Storia del Portogallo [History of Portugal]. Milano: B. Mondadori. ISBN 978-88-6159-046-5.
- Strozzi, Girolamo; Mastroianni, Roberto (2016). Diritto dell'Unione Europea. Parte istituzionale [European Union Law: Institutional Part] (7 ed.). Torino: Giappichelli. ISBN 978-88-921-0528-7.
- Tanzi, Annalisa, ed. (1995). Manuale di Diritto Canonico [Manual of Canon Law] (2 ed.). Roma: CxT. ISBN 978-88-8214-154-7.
