= University of Göttingen =

Public university in Göttingen, Germany

Coordinates: 51°32′31″N 9°56′04″E

- Georg-August-Universität Göttingen
- Latin: Universitas Regiæ Georgiæ Augustæ
- Motto: In publica commoda (Latin)
- Motto in English: For the good of all
- Type: Public
- Established: 7 December 1737; 288 years ago
- Affiliations: German Excellence Universities, U15, EUA, U4 Network, Guild of European Research-Intensive Universities
- Budget: €1.438 billion
- President: Axel Schölmerich
- Academic staff: 4,551 (2021)
- Administrative staff: 8,825 (2021)
- Students: 30,200 (2020–2021)
- Doctoral students: 713 (2021)
- Location: Göttingen, Lower Saxony, Germany
- Campus: University town
- Colours: Dark blue
- Website: uni-goettingen.de

- Location within Germany Location within Lower Saxony

The University of Göttingen, officially the Georg August University of Göttingen (German: Georg-August-Universität Göttingen, commonly referred to as Georgia Augusta), is a public research university in the German city of Göttingen, Lower Saxony. Founded in 1734 by the Electorate of Hanover's government on the orders of George II, it began admitting students in 1737 and is recognized as the oldest university in Lower Saxony. Known for its historic and traditional significance, the university has affiliations with 47 Nobel Prize winners by its own count.

The university reached its academic peak between the late 19th to early 20th centuries, establishing itself as a major international center for mathematics and physics. During this period, scholars such as David Hilbert, Felix Klein, Max Born, and Ludwig Prandtl conducted influential research in mathematics, quantum mechanics, and aerodynamics at the university, which attracted an international student body, including prominent Americans such as Edward Everett, George Bancroft, John Lothrop Motley and J. Robert Oppenheimer. This prominence was severely disrupted by Adolf Hitler's rise to power in 1933, which saw the Nazi government pass the Civil Service Law that resulted in the dismissal or emigration of numerous faculty members, including many of Jewish origin or those opposed to the new regime. The university was subsequently reopened in British-occupied Germany in 1945 and began a process of academic reconstruction.

Today, the university is a member of the U15 group of major German research universities. It is also a part of prominent international and European academic networks such as the Guild of European Research-Intensive Universities, ENLIGHT alliance and HeKKSaGOn network. The university maintains close collaborations with leading Göttingen-based research institutions such as Max Planck Society, Leibniz Association, Fraunhofer Society and Helmholtz Association. With its extensive collection, the Göttingen State and University Library stands among Germany's largest libraries.

== History ==
=== Inauguration ===
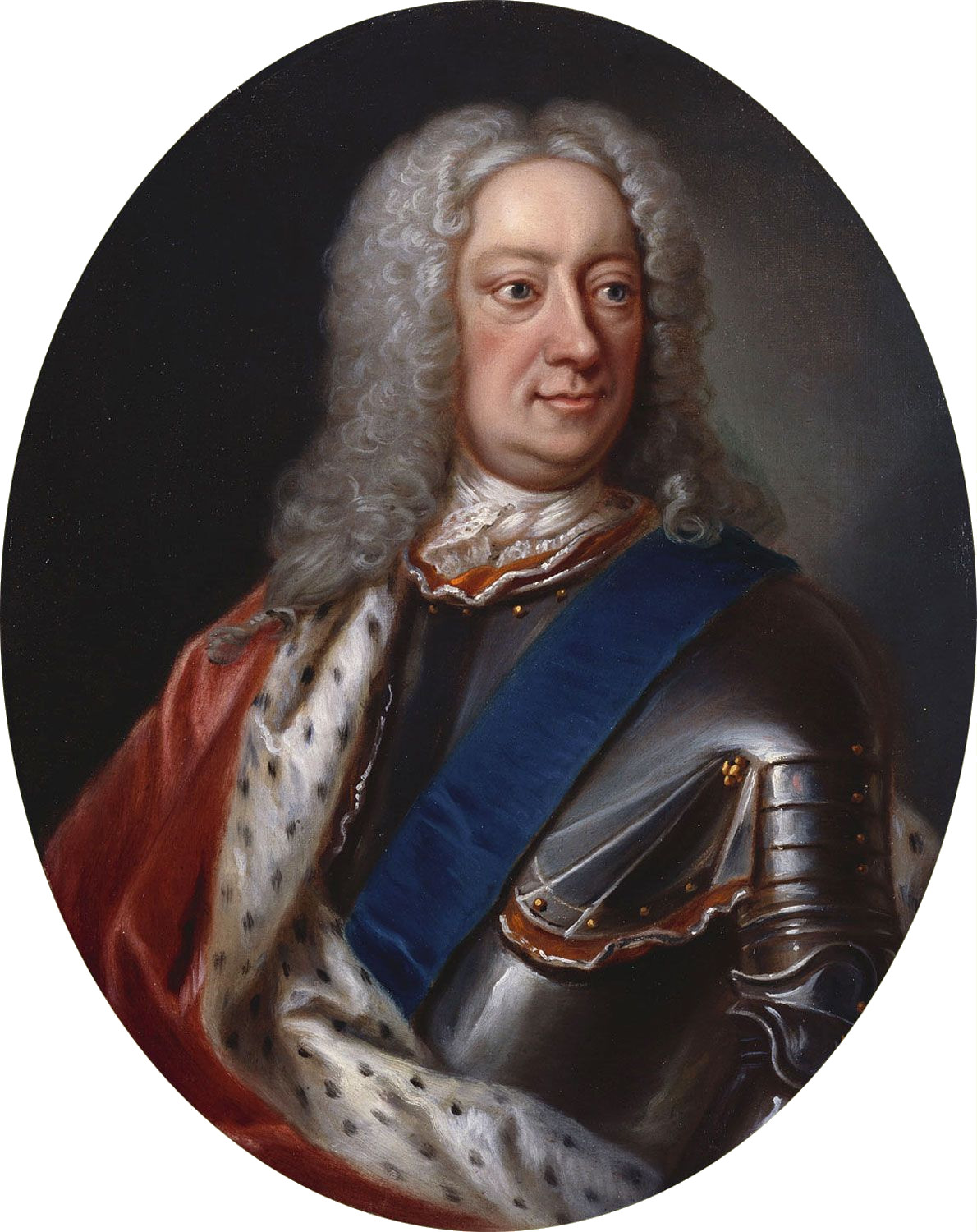
George II of Hanover, founder and first president of the university

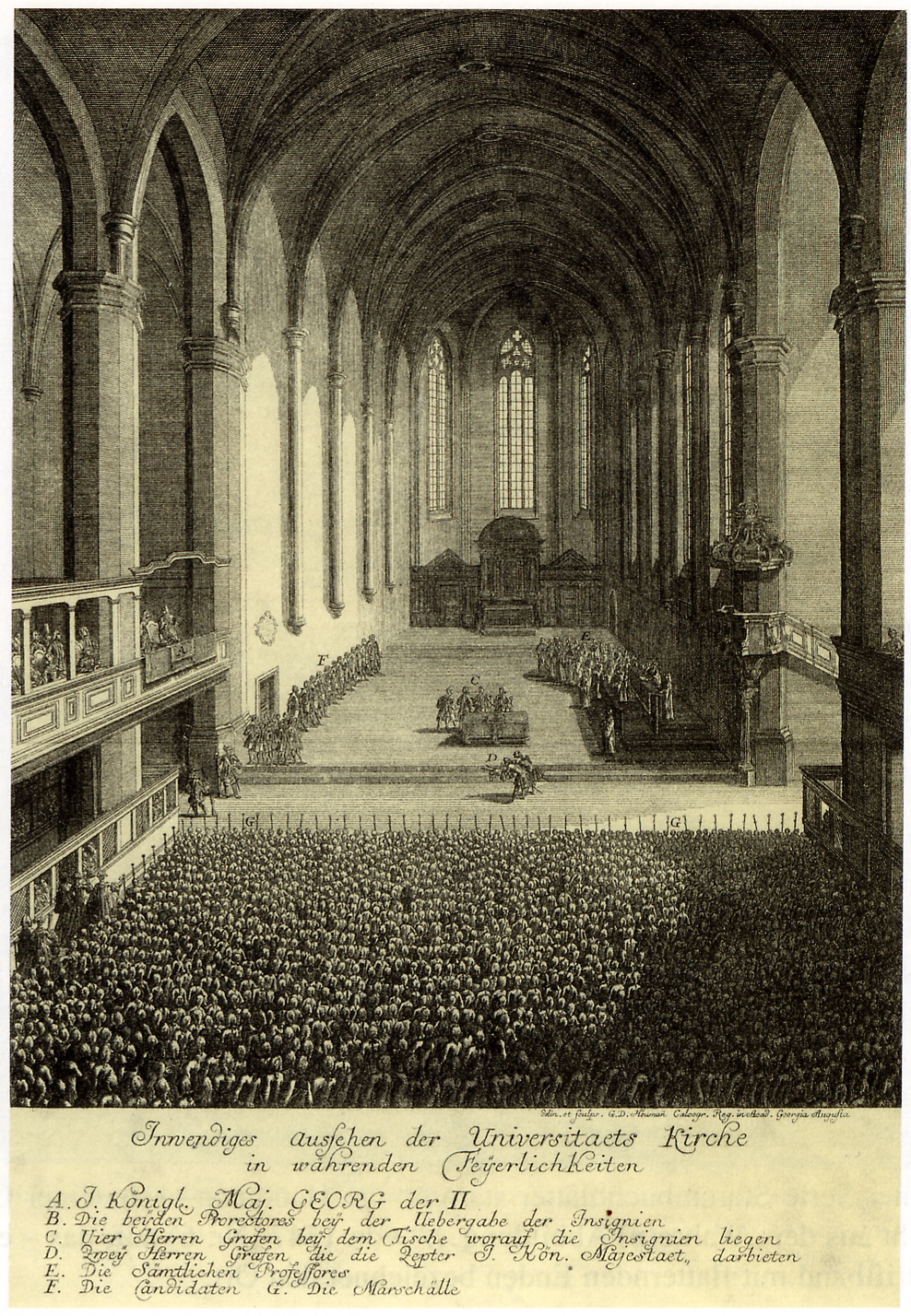
George II in the Pauliner Church in 1748

In 1734 George II of Hanover ordered Gerlach Adolph von Münchhausen, a member of the Electorate of Hanover's privy council, to establish a university in Göttingen to spread Enlightenment ideals. Napoleon famously remarked, "Göttingen belongs neither to a State, nor to Germany, and is the University of Europe".

The initial university infrastructure was modest, comprising only a riding hall and a fencing house, with lectures held in the Paulinerkirche, Dominican monastery, or professors' homes. A university auditorium wasn't constructed until the 19th century.

=== 18th–19th centuries ===
Throughout the 18th century, the University of Göttingen was renowned among German universities for its commitment to the free spirit and scientific exploration. Georg Christoph Lichtenberg, a prominent scholar, held one of the first professorships dedicated to experimental physics in Germany from 1769 to 1799. By 1812, Göttingen had established itself as a modern, internationally recognized university, boasting a library with over 200,000 volumes.

In the first years of the University of Göttingen, it became known especially for its Faculty of Law. In the 18th century Johann Stephan Pütter, a scholar of public law at that time, taught jus publicum for half a century. The subject had attracted students such as Klemens Wenzel Lothar von Metternich, later diplomat and Prime Minister of Austria, and Wilhelm von Humboldt, who later established the University of Berlin. In the 19th century, Gustav Hugo, Karl Friedrich Eichhorn, and Georg Friedrich Sartorius, who taught law here, became the pioneers of the German Historical School of Jurisprudence. At the time, Göttingen was a very popular place for the study of law in Germany: Even the great German poet Heinrich Heine obtained a doctorate in law here in 1825. Otto von Bismarck, the main creator and the first Chancellor of the second German Empire, also studied law in Göttingen in 1833: he lived in a tiny house on the "Wall", now known as "Bismarck Cottage". According to oral tradition, he lived there because his rowdiness had caused him to be banned from living within the city walls. By the university's centenary in 1837, it was known as the "university of law", as the students enrolled by the faculty of law often made up more than half of the university's students. At the end of the 19th century, the famous civil law scholar Rudolf von Jhering, who created the theory of "culpa in contrahendo" (fault in conclusion of a contract), remained a law professor in Göttingen until he died. Lassa Francis Lawrence Oppenheim, known as the father of the modern discipline of international law and author of the famous two-volume "International Law: A Treatise", earned his doctorate in law from the University of Göttingen in 1881.

Likewise, the Faculty of Theology in conjunction with other orientalists and ancient historians across the university became an international center for the study of religion and antiquity.

In 1809, Arthur Schopenhauer, the German philosopher best known for his work The World as Will and Representation, became a student at the university, where he studied metaphysics and psychology under Gottlob Ernst Schulze, who advised him to concentrate on Plato and Kant.

During this time, the University of Göttingen achieved renown for its critical work on history as well. An Enlightenment institution, it produced the Göttingen school of history. Later, Max Weber, one of the most important theorists of the development of modern Western society, also studied history in Göttingen.

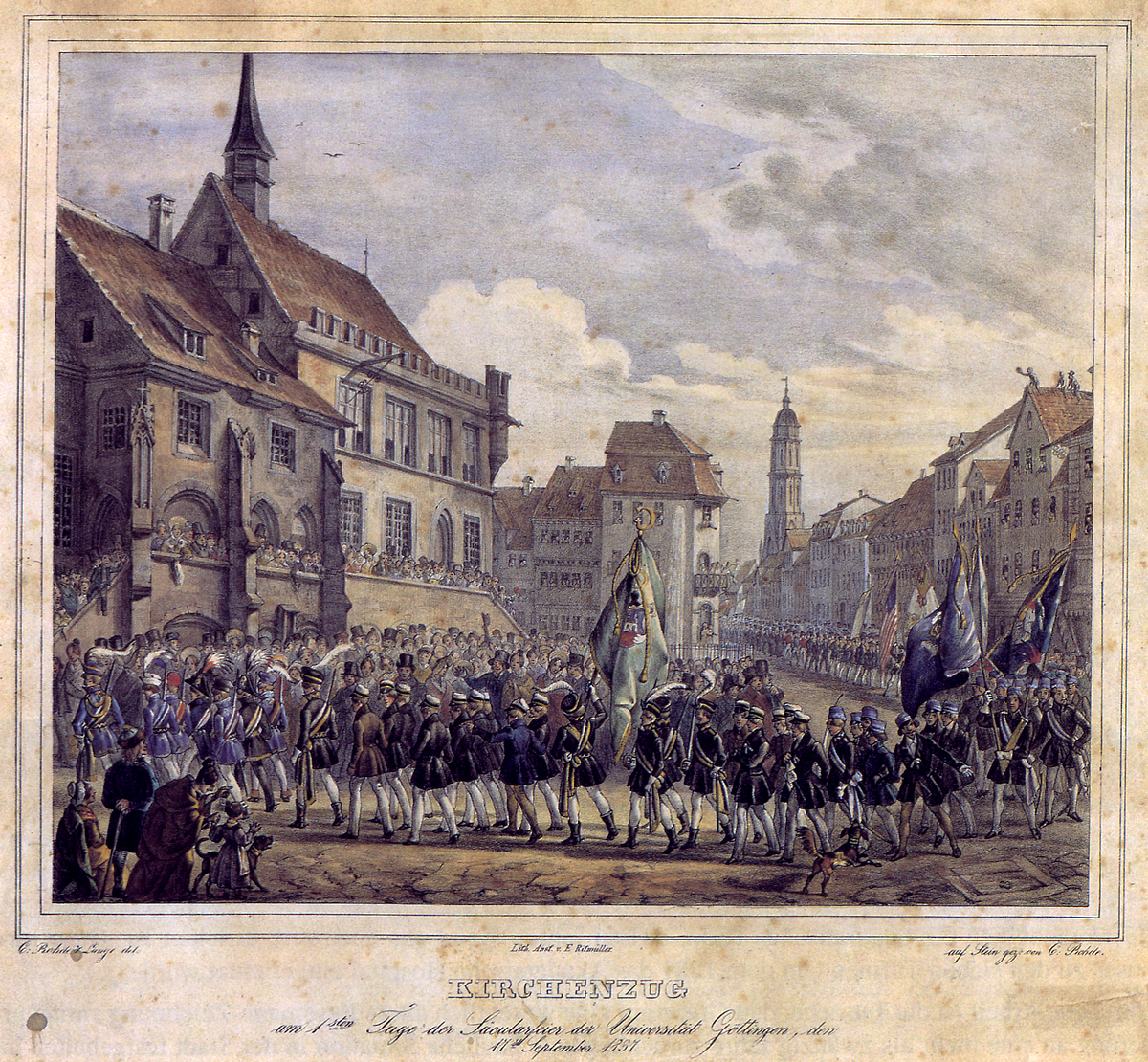
Student parade – university anniversary 1837

The Brothers Grimm, the best-known storytellers of folktales like "Cinderella", "The Frog Prince", "Little Red Riding Hood", "Sleeping Beauty", and "Snow White", taught here and compiled the first German dictionary.

However, political disturbances, in which both professors and students were implicated, lowered the attendance to 860 in 1834. The expulsion in 1837 of the seven professors – the so-called Die Göttinger Sieben (the Germanist Wilhelm Eduard Albrecht (1800–1876), the historian Friedrich Christoph Dahlmann (1785–1860), the orientalist Georg Heinrich August Ewald (1803–1875), the historian Georg Gottfried Gervinus (1805–1875), the physicist Wilhelm Eduard Weber (1804–1891), and the philologist brothers Jakob (1785–1863) and Wilhelm Grimm (1786–1859)) – for protesting against the revocation by Ernest Augustus, King of Hanover, of the liberal constitution of 1833 hurt the reputation of the city and the university.

=== Turn of the 20th century ===
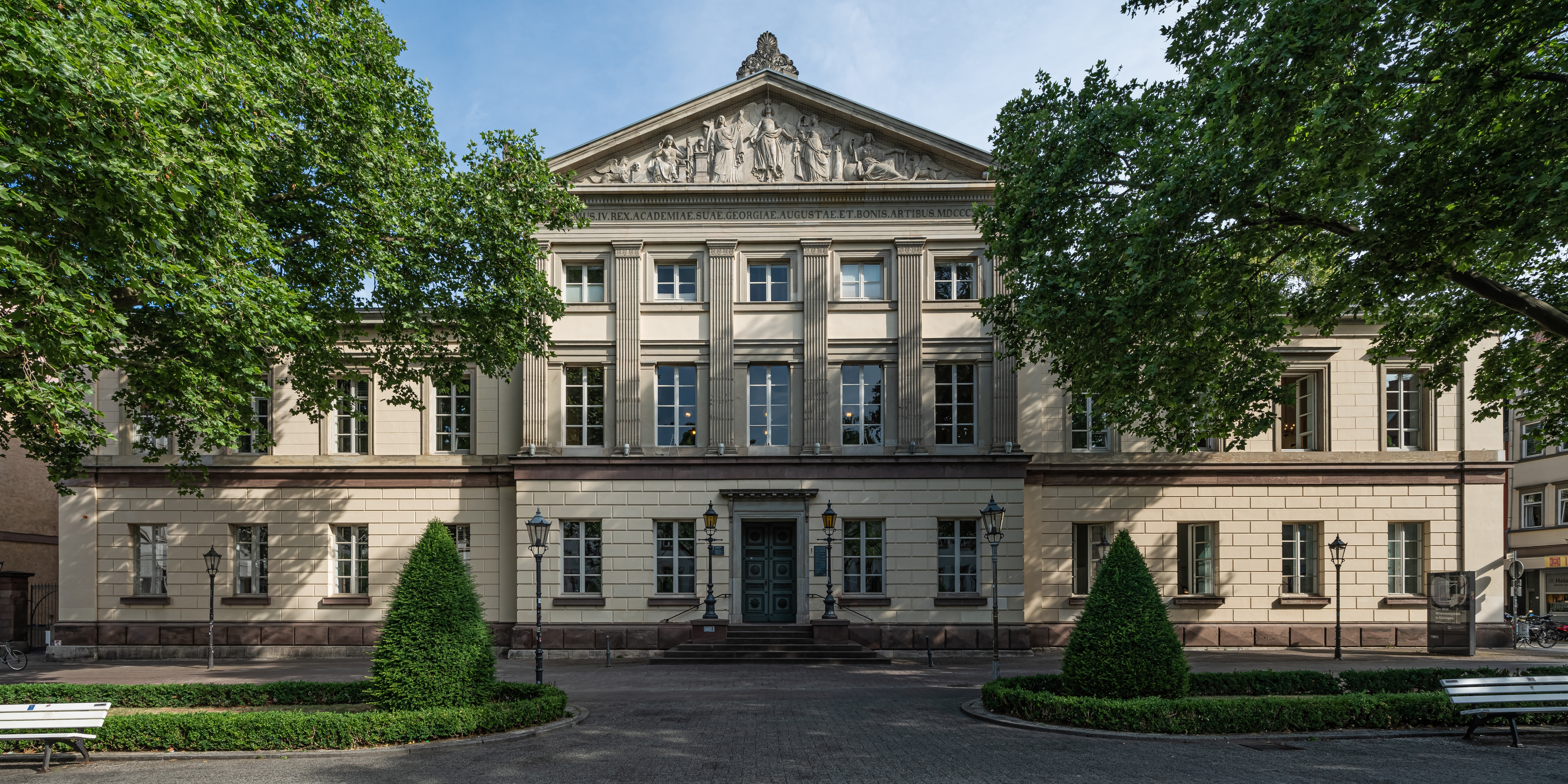
Alte Aula (Great Hall), also Karzer, at Wilhelmsplatz (built in 1835–1837)

At the end of the 19th and beginning of the 20th century, the University of Göttingen achieved its academic peak. Göttingen maintained a strong focus on natural science, especially mathematics. The tradition began with Carl Friedrich Gauss, who was known as "the Prince of Mathematicians" and taught here in the 18th century. Thereafter, Dirichlet and Riemann took over the chair successively and made significant contributions in the fields of algebra, geometry, and number theory. By 1900, David Hilbert and Felix Klein had attracted mathematicians from around the world to Göttingen, which made it a leading center of mathematics by the turn of the 20th century.

In 1903, its teaching staff numbered 121 and its students 1529. Edmund Husserl, a famous philosopher known as the father of phenomenology, moved to Göttingen to teach. Ludwig Prandtl joined the University of Göttingen in 1904, and developed it into a leader in fluid mechanics and in aerodynamics over the next two decades. In 1925, Prandtl was appointed as the director of the Kaiser Wilhelm Institute for Fluid Mechanics. He introduced the concept of boundary layer and founded mathematical aerodynamics by calculating air flow in the down wind direction. Many of Prandtl's students went on to make fundamental contributions to aerodynamics. Between 1921 and 1933, the physics theory group was led by Max Born, who, during this time, became one of the three discoverers of the non-relativistic theory of quantum mechanics. He may also have been the first to propose its probabilistic relationship with classical physics. It was one of the main centers of the development of modern physics. Oppenheimer, the American scientist and "father of the atomic bomb", was one of Max Born's most famous students and received his doctorate here.

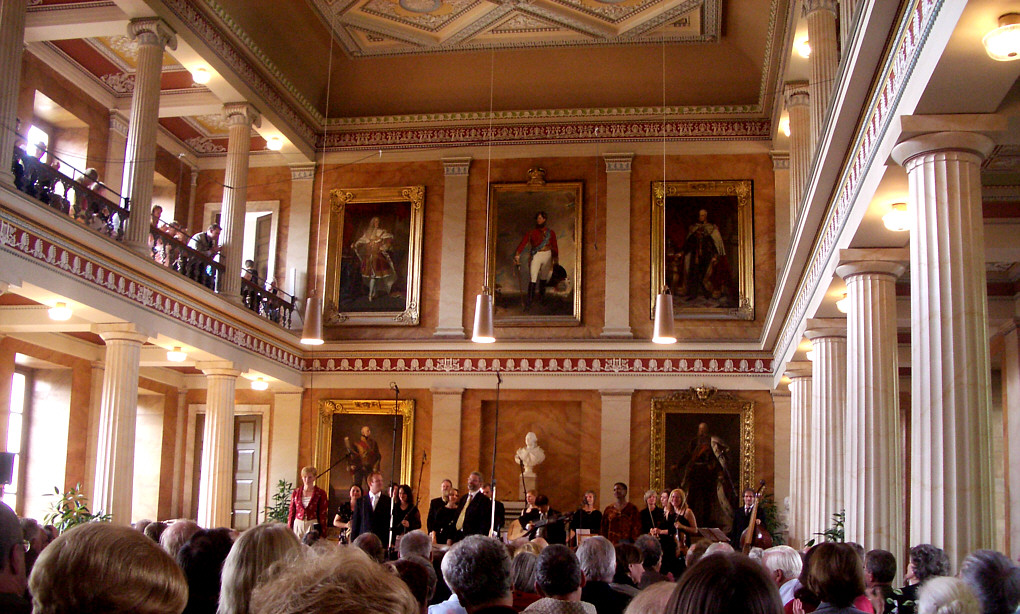
The interior of the university Aula

During this time, the German language became an international academic language. A number of dissertations in the UK and the US had German titles. One might be considered having had a complete academic training only when one had studied in Germany. Thus, many American students were proud of having studied in Germany, and the University of Göttingen had profound impacts on the US. A number of American politicians, lawyers, historians and writers received their education from both Harvard and Göttingen. For example, Edward Everett, once Secretary of State and President of Harvard University, stayed in Göttingen for two years of study. George Ticknor spent two years studying classics in Göttingen. Even John Lothrop Motley, a diplomat and historian, had personal friendship with Otto von Bismarck during his two-year-long study in Göttingen. George Bancroft, a politician and historian, received his PhD from the University of Göttingen in 1820.

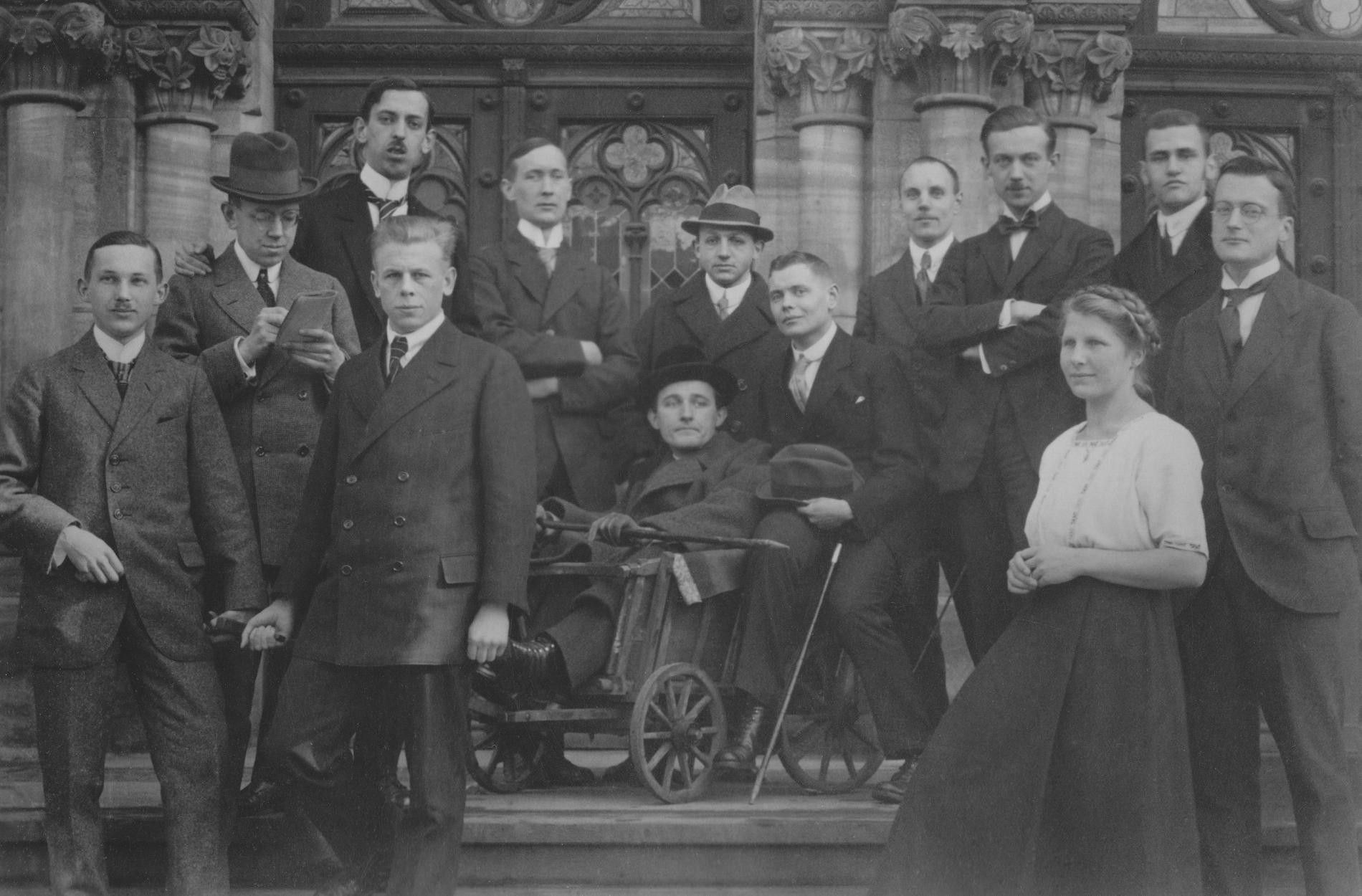
Mathematicians celebrating Siegel's Ph.D. graduation, June 1920 at Göttingen: Grandjot, Bessel-Hagen, Rogosinski, Ness, Windau, Siegel (in the trolley), Walfisz, Krull, Emersleben, Kopfermann, Hedwig Wolff, Boskowits, Kneser.

=== "Great purge" of 1933 ===
In the 1930s, the university became a focal point for the Nazi crackdown on "Jewish physics", as represented by the work of Albert Einstein, in favor of "German physics". In what was later called the "great purge" of 1933, academics including Max Born, Victor Goldschmidt, James Franck, Eugene Wigner, Leó Szilárd, Edward Teller, Edmund Landau, Emmy Noether, and Richard Courant were expelled or fled. Most of them fled Nazi Germany for places like the United States, Canada, and the United Kingdom. Following the great purge, in 1934 David Hilbert, by then a symbol of German mathematics, was dining with Bernhard Rust, the Nazi minister of education. Allegedly, Rust asked, "How is mathematics at Göttingen, now that it is free from the Jewish influence?" Hilbert replied, "There is no mathematics in Göttingen anymore."

=== Renovation after WWII ===
After World War II, the University of Göttingen was the first university in the western Zones to be re-opened under British control in 1945. Göttingen's history of affiliation with numerous celebrities continued: Jürgen Habermas, a famous German philosopher and sociologist, pursued his study in Göttingen. Later, Richard von Weizsäcker, a late President of Germany, earned his doctorate in law here. Gerhard Schröder, a former Chancellor of Germany, also graduated from the Faculty of Law in Göttingen. Ursula von der Leyen, President of the European Commission, studied economics in Göttingen, where she met her husband Heiko von der Leyen.

== Campus ==
The university is spread out in several locations around the city.

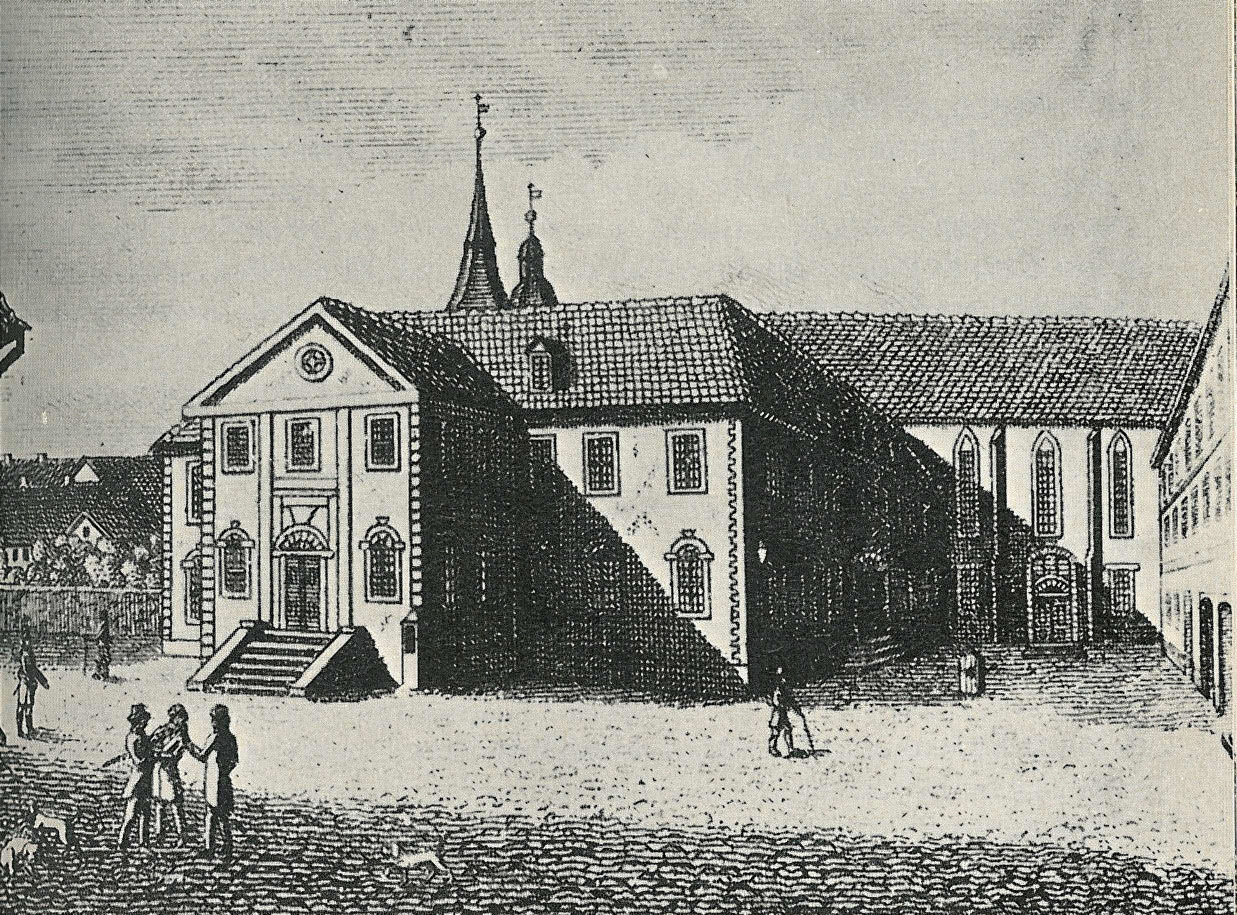
The old Göttingen university campus and library building, called the Collegiate Building, c. 1815

The central university complex with the Central Library and Mensa (student refectory/dining hall) is located right next to the inner city and comprises the faculties for Theology, Social sciences, Law, Economics/Business Administration and Linguistics. The departments of Ancient History, Classics, various languages, Psychology and Philosophy are nearby. Located to the south of the city is the Faculty of Mathematics and Computer Science with its main building, the Mathematisches Institut, on the same street as the German Aerospace Center and the Max Planck Institute for Dynamics and Self-Organisation. In other parts of the city are the departments of Anthropology and Educational Sciences as well as the Medical Faculty with its associated hospitals.

Just north of the city a new scientific center has been built in which most of the natural sciences (chemistry, biology, plant pathology, agronomy, forestry, geology, physics, computer science) are now located, including the GZMB. Other institutes are set around the inner city.

=== Library ===
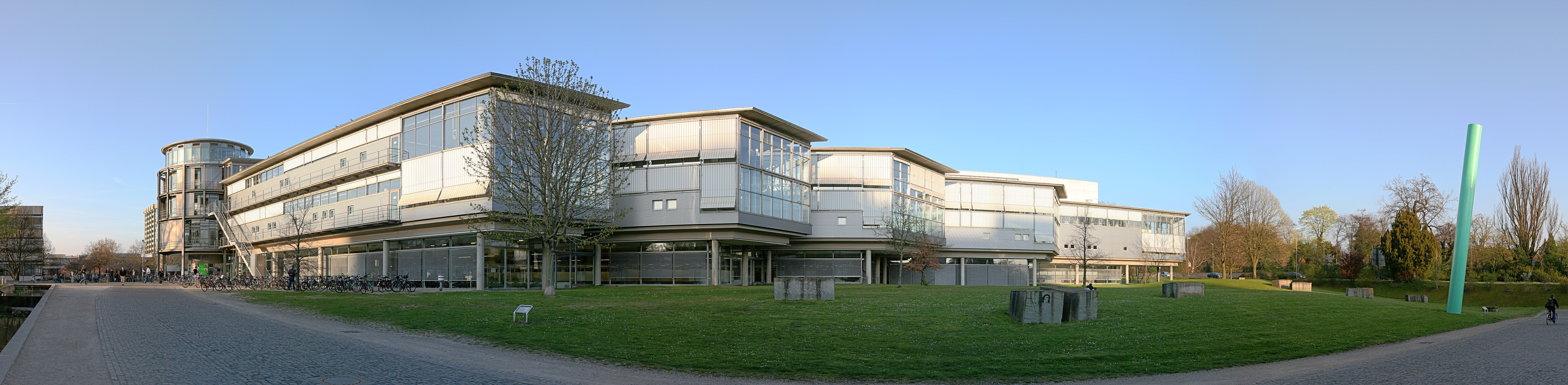
Central Library and "Raumskulptur" sculpture

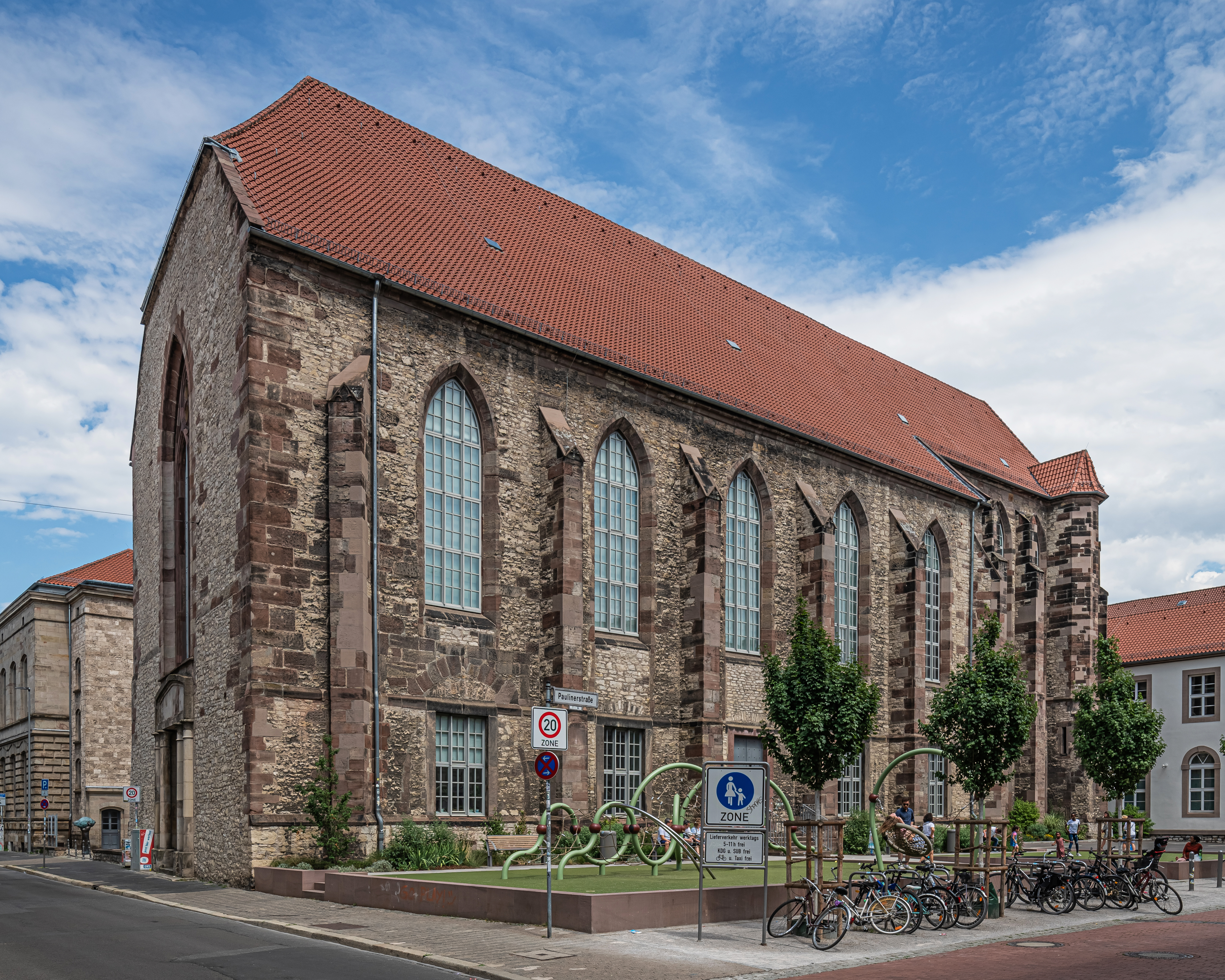
The Pauliner Church, once the seat of the University Library in which Heinrich Heine, the Brothers Grimm, and Goethe worked

Closely linked with the university is the Göttingen State and University Library (German: Niedersächsische Staats- und Universitätsbibliothek Göttingen, or SUB Göttingen). With around 9 million media units and precious manuscripts, the library is designed for Göttingen University as well as the central library for the German State of Lower Saxony (with its central catalogue) and for the Göttingen Academy of Sciences, founded as the 'Royal Society for Sciences'.

=== Gardens ===
The university maintains three botanical gardens: the Alter Botanischer Garten der Universität Göttingen, the Neuer Botanischer Garten der Universität Göttingen, and the Forstbotanischer Garten und Pflanzengeographisches Arboretum der Universität Göttingen.

== Organisation ==
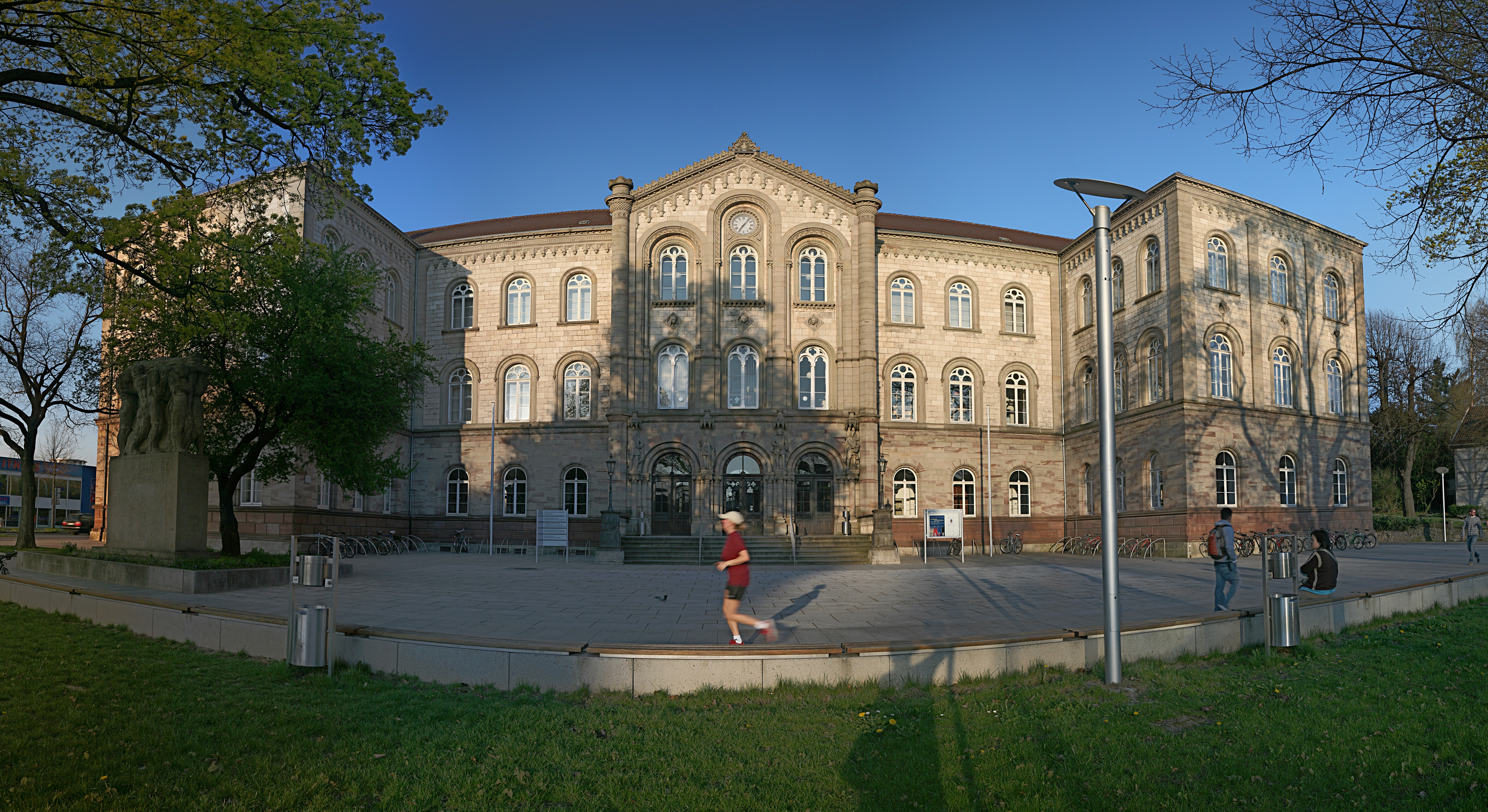
The old Auditorium Maximum (built in 1826–1865)

As of 2023, the university consists of 13 faculties and around 22,484 students are enrolled. 535 professors and over 4,000 academic staff work at the university, assisted by a technical and administrative staff of over 7,000. The post-war expansion of the university led to the establishment of a new, modern "university quarter" in the north of the city. The architecture of the old university can still be seen in the Auditorium Maximum (1826/1865) and the Great Hall (1835/1837) at Wilhelmsplatz.

=== Faculties, centers, and institutes ===
The University of Göttingen encompasses 13 faculties and a total of 38 additional centers and institutes (including associated centers and institutes but excluding institutes or departments within the faculties themselves).

Faculties

- Faculty of Agricultural Sciences
- Faculty of Biology and Psychology
- Faculty of Chemistry
- Faculty of Forest Sciences and Forest Ecology
- Faculty of Geoscience and Geography
- Faculty of Mathematics and Computer Science
- Faculty of Physics
- Faculty of Law
- Faculty of Social Sciences
- Faculty of Economic Sciences
- Faculty of Humanities
- Faculty of Theology
- Medical Center (Universitätsmedizin Göttingen)

Centers and institutes

Humanities and Theology
- Centre for Global Migration Studies (CeMig)
- Centre for Modern East Asian Studies (CeMEAS)
- Centre for Modern Indian Studies (CeMIS)
- Centrum Orbis Orientalis et Occidentalis (CORO) – Centre for Ancient and Oriental Studies
- The Göttingen Centre for Digital Humanities (GCDH)
- Göttinger Center for Gender Studies (GCG)
- International Writing Centre
- Centre for Medieval and Early Modern Studies (ZMF)
- Center of Modern Humanities (ZTMK)
- Forum for Interdisciplinary Religious Studies (FIRSt)

Natural Sciences, Mathematics, and Informatics

- Bernstein Center for Computational Neuroscience Göttingen (BCCN)
- Courant Research Center Higher Order Structures in Mathematics
- European Neuroscience Institute (ENI)
- Geoscience Centre
- Göttingen Center for Molecular Biosciences (GZMB)
- Göttingen Campus Institute for Dynamics of Biological Networks
- International Center for Advanced Studies of Energy Conversion (ICASEC)
- Leibniz-ScienceCampus Primate Cognition
- Center for Computational Sciences
- Centre of Biodiversity and sustainable Land Use
- Center for Integrated Breeding Research
- Centre for Nanoscale Microscopy and Molecular Physiology of the Brain (CNMPB)
- Center for Systems Neuroscience
- Centre for Statistics (ZfS)

Law, Economic Sciences, and Social Sciences

- Center for European, Governance and Economic Development Research (cege)
- Courant Research Centre Poverty, Equity and Growth in Developing Countries
- Göttingen Center for Genderstudies (GGG)
- Diversity Research Institute
- Interdisciplinary Center for Sustainable Development (IZNE)
- Center for Social Science Methods (MZS)
- Centre for Empirical Research into Teaching and Schools (ZeUS)
- Centre for Medical Law

Associated Institutes

- Academic Confucius Institute (AKI)
- Information Network of Departments of Dermatology (IVDK)
- Institute of Sugar Beet Research
- Institute of Applied Plant Nutrition (IAPN)
- Sociological Research Institute (SOFI)
- Institute for Economics in Small Business Economics

== Academics ==
=== Rankings ===
University rankings

Overall – Global & National
QS World 2024	232	13
THE World 2024	111	10
ARWU World 2023	151–200	6–9

In the QS World University Rankings 2024, it was placed the 232nd internationally and the 13th nationally. The Times Higher Education World University Rankings for 2024 ranked it as 111th globally and 10th at the national level. According to the 2023 ARWU World Rankings, the university holds a position within the 151–200 range internationally and between the 6th and 9th domestically. In the 2023 Center for World University Rankings (CWUR), the University of Göttingen was ranked the 97th worldwide and the 6th nationwide. In the 2024–2025 U.S. News Best Global Universities Rankings, it was ranked tied for 172nd globally and the 8th nationally. In the inaugural TIME World's Top Universities of 2026, it is ranked 101st globally and the 4th nationally.

QS Subject Ranking 2024
Subject	Global	National
Arts & Humanities	▼188	▼10
Linguistics	201–250	15
Theology, Divinity and Religious Studies	▼30	▼6
Archaeology	101–150	▲9–10
Classics and Ancient History	51–90	▲7–11
English Language and Literature	201–250	▼10–11
History	101–150	6–10
Modern Languages	▲101–150	▲6–8
Philosophy	▲151–200	▲15–18
Engineering and Technology	N/A	N/A
Life Sciences & Medicine	▲96	▲4
Agriculture and Forestry	▲24	▲1
Biological Sciences	▲81	▲3
Medicine	161	▲10
Pharmacy and Pharmacology	251–300	13–16
Natural Sciences	▲125	12
Chemistry	▼139	▼10
Earth and Marine Sciences	101–150	8–13
Environmental Sciences	116	▼6
Geography	▼151–200	▼7–10
Geology	101–150	7–13
Geophysics	101–150	7–13
Mathematics	▼201–250	13
Physics & Astronomy	▼151–200	▼13–18
Social Sciences & Management	▼451–500	▼15–20
Anthropology	101–150	6–8
Business and Management Studies	551–580	13–14
Development Studies	▼51-100	1-3
Economics and Econometrics	201–250	9–10
Law and Legal Studies	201–250	9–12
Sociology	▼251–300	▼13–15
Statistics and Operational Research	101–150	▼5–6

THE Subject Ranking 2024
Subject	Global	National
Arts & humanities	▲101–125	10–12
Clinical & health	▲126–150	▲8-11
Computer science	251–300	18–23
Law	101–125	▼8
Life sciences	▼ =51	4
Physical sciences	▼72	▼7
Psychology	▲151–175	▲15–20
Social sciences	▼201–250	9–13

ARWU Subject Ranking 2023
Subject	Global	National
Natural Sciences
Atmospheric Science	201–300	▲15–20
Chemistry	▼151–200	▼10–12
Earth Sciences	▼201–300	▼15–20
Ecology	▲24	▲1
Geography	▼151–200	▼5-9
Mathematics	101–150	6–9
Physics	▼201–300	▼13–23
Engineering
Biotechnology	▼401–500	▼27–30
Environmental Science & Engineering	▲201–300	▲7–12
Nanoscience & Nanotechnology	301–400	▲18–27
Water Resources	151–200	9–10
Life Sciences
Agricultural Sciences	▲14	1
Biological Sciences	▼101–150	▼8–12
Human Biological Sciences	▼101–150	▼10–16
Veterinary Sciences	201–300	▼9–11
Medical Sciences
Clinical Medicine	▲151–200	▲8–13
Dentistry & Oral Sciences	▼201–300	▼21–24
Medical Technology	▼151–200	▼21–23
Public Health	▼401–500	▼16–22
Social Sciences
Economics	▲76–100	▲3
Political Sciences	▼301–400	▼17–26
Psychology	▼201–300	▼20–25
Statistics	▼101–150	1–3

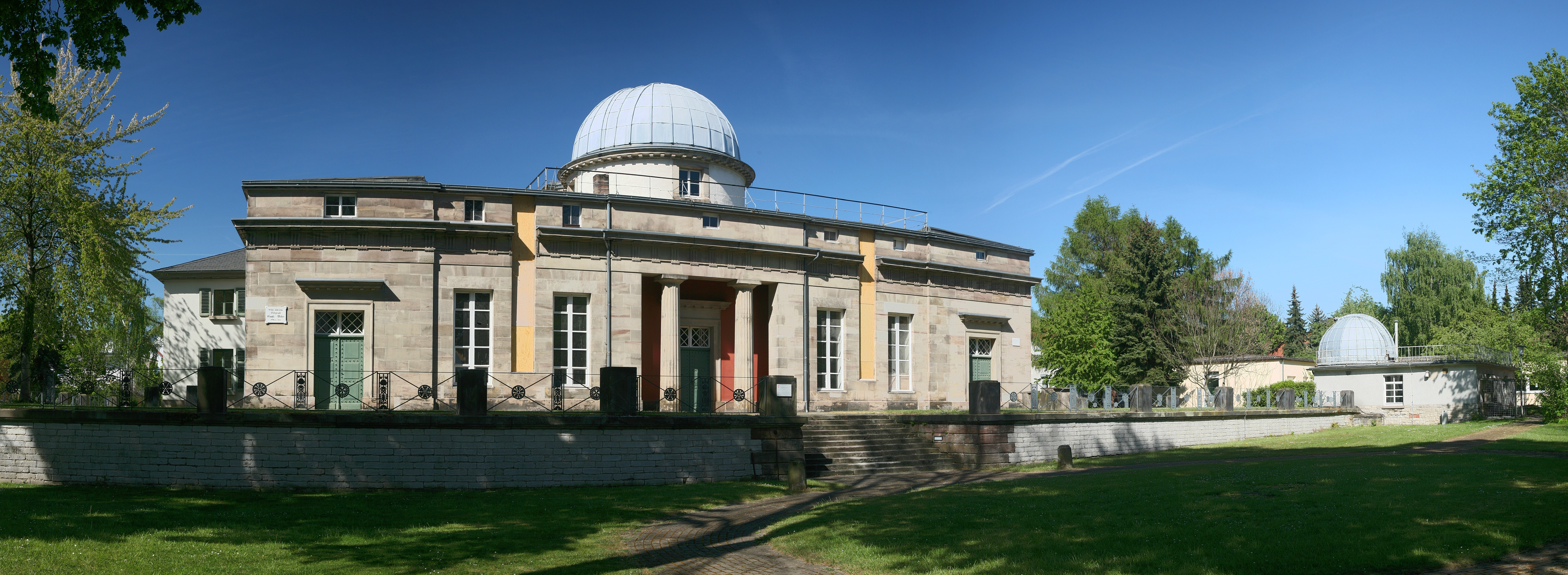
Traditional Observatory of the university

Within the framework of the 2006–07 German Universities Excellence Initiative, it won funding for its future concept "Tradition, Innovation, Autonomy", its graduate school "Neurosciences and Molecular Biosciences", and its research cluster "Microscopy at the Nanometer Range". In the 2012 Excellence Initiative, Göttingen succeeded in obtaining funds for its graduate school "Neurosciences and Molecular Biosciences" and its research cluster "Microscopy at the Nanometer Range". In September 2018, Göttingen succeeded in gaining funds for its research cluster "Multiscale Bioimaging" as part of the excellence initiative's successor, the Excellence Strategy. This cluster lost its funding for the second funding round in 2025.

=== Historical reputation and impact ===
The University of Göttingen is a traditional institution with a significant historical standing. This is substantiated by a scientific study on the historical development of world university rankings starting in 2013, which examined a web dataset from 24 Wikipedia language versions, covering 59% of the world's population and accounting for 68% of all Wikipedia articles across 287 languages. This comprehensive analysis identified the most influential universities globally over the past ten centuries, resulting in the "2017 Wikipedia World University Rankings", where the University of Göttingen ranked the 20th in terms of "web page rank" (search engine data), the 8th on account of "chei rank" (interactive citation data), and the 6th in the world on "2D rank" combining both categories of data.

As of 2002, the University of Göttingen was associated with 44 Nobel laureates according to an official count released by the University of Göttingen in that year. By this number alone, the University of Göttingen ranked among the global top 15 universities. Recent Nobel laureates associated with the university are Klaus Hasselmann (Nobel Prize in Physics, 2021), Stefan Hell (Nobel Prize in Chemistry, 2014), Thomas C. Südhof (Nobel Prize in Physiology or Medicine, 2013), and Thomas Arthur Steitz (Nobel Prize in Chemistry, 2009). Klaus Hasselmann received his PhD in physics from the University of Göttingen in 1957. Stefan Hell has been a lecturer (in Privatdozent capacity) at the University of Göttingen since 2004 and the director of the Max Planck Institute for Biophysical Chemistry in the Göttingen Campus since 2002. Thomas Südhof, currently a professor at Stanford University, worked on his doctoral thesis at the Max Planck Institute for Biophysical Chemistry in the lab of British biochemist Victor P. Whittaker and received his PhD in medical science from the University of Göttingen in 1982. Thomas Arthur Steitz was a Macy Fellow at the University of Göttingen during 1976–1977.

Today, a number of judges in national and international courts of the highest level are still affiliated with the Faculty of Law. As of 2021, four out of sixteen in-office Justices of the Federal Constitutional Court (German: Bundesverfassungsgericht; abbreviated: BVerfG), Germany's supreme constitutional court, are affiliated with the University of Göttingen: two of them (Andreas Paulus & Christine Langenfeld) are, currently, professors at the Faculty of Law of the University of Göttingen, while two others (Ines Härtel & Henning Radtke) obtained their PhD in law (Dr.iur) from the University of Göttingen. Also in 2021, Georg Nolte, a former professor of public international law at the University of Göttingen, took office as Judge of the International Court of Justice on behalf of the Federal Republic of Germany. Hsu Tzong-li, a Taiwanese judge who has served as the President of the Judicial Yuan (Taiwan's constitutional court) since 2016, earned his doctorate in law from University of Göttingen in 1986.

=== Partner institutions ===
Within the Göttingen Campus the university is organizationally and personally interlinked with the following independent and semi-independent institutions:

- Bernstein Network Computational Neuroscience
- European Neuroscience Institute Göttingen (ENI-G)
- Fraunhofer Institute for Translational Medicine and Pharmacology (ITMP)
- Application Center for Plasma and Photonics of the Fraunhofer Institute for Surface Engineering and Thin Films IS
- German Aerospace Center
- German Center for Neurodegenerative Diseases (DZNE) – Helmholtz Centre
- German Primate Center – Leibniz Institute for Primate Research
- Max Planck Institute for Dynamics and Self-Organization, formerly Max Planck Institute for Flow Research
- Max Planck Institute for Multidisciplinary Sciences, a 2022 merger of formerly Max Planck Institute for Biophysical Chemistry and formerly Max Planck Institute for Experimental Medicine
- Max Planck Institute for Solar System Research, formerly Max Planck Institute for Aeronomy
- Max Planck Institute for the Study of Religious and Ethnic Diversity, formerly Max Planck Institute for History

=== Exchange programs ===
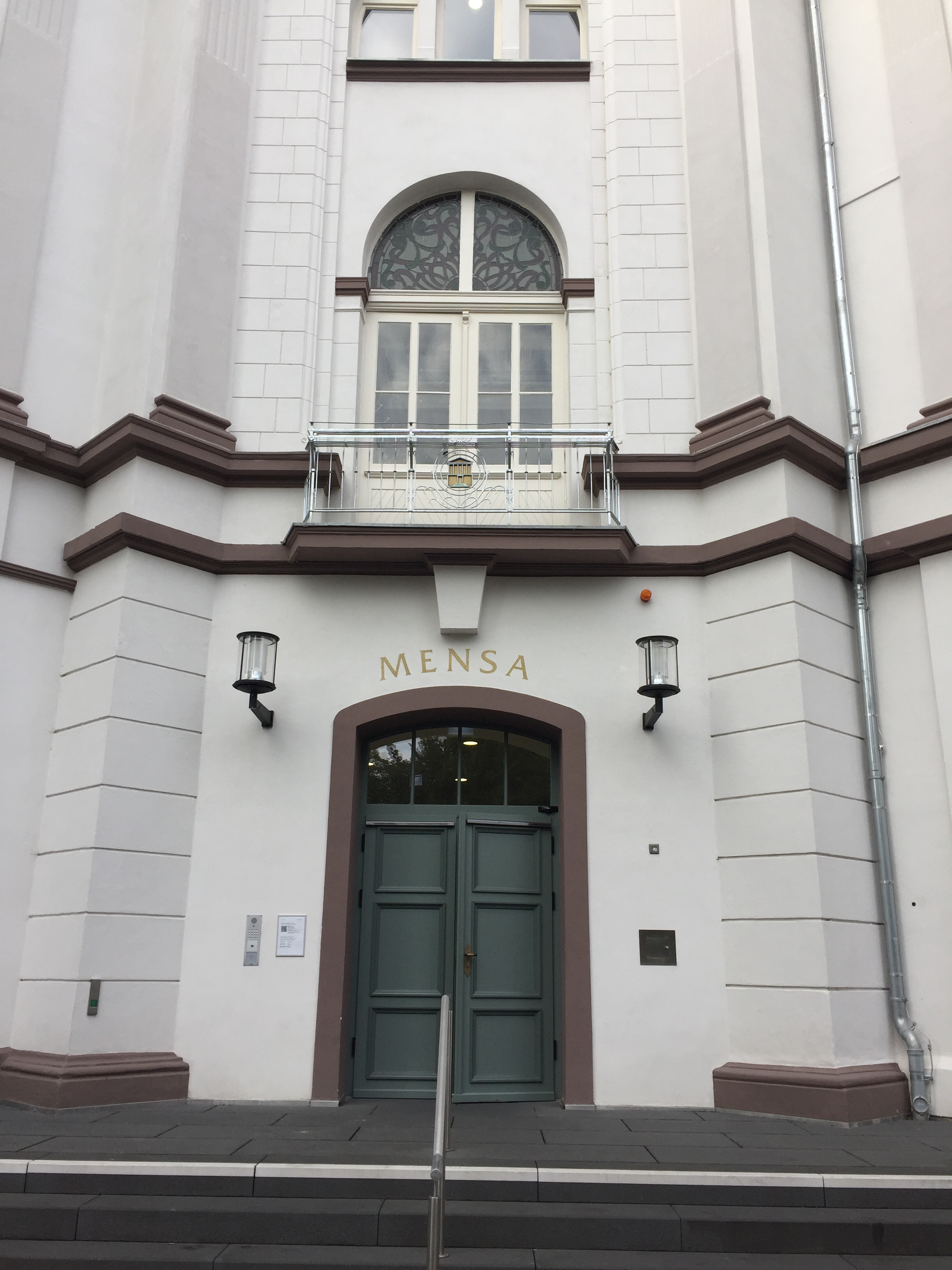
The Alte Mensa

As Germany is a member of the European Union, university students have the opportunity to participate in the Erasmus Programme. The university also has exchange programs and partnerships with reputable universities outside Europe such as Tsinghua University, Peking University and Fudan University in China, Kyoto University and Waseda University in Japan and Amherst College in the United States.

== Traditions ==
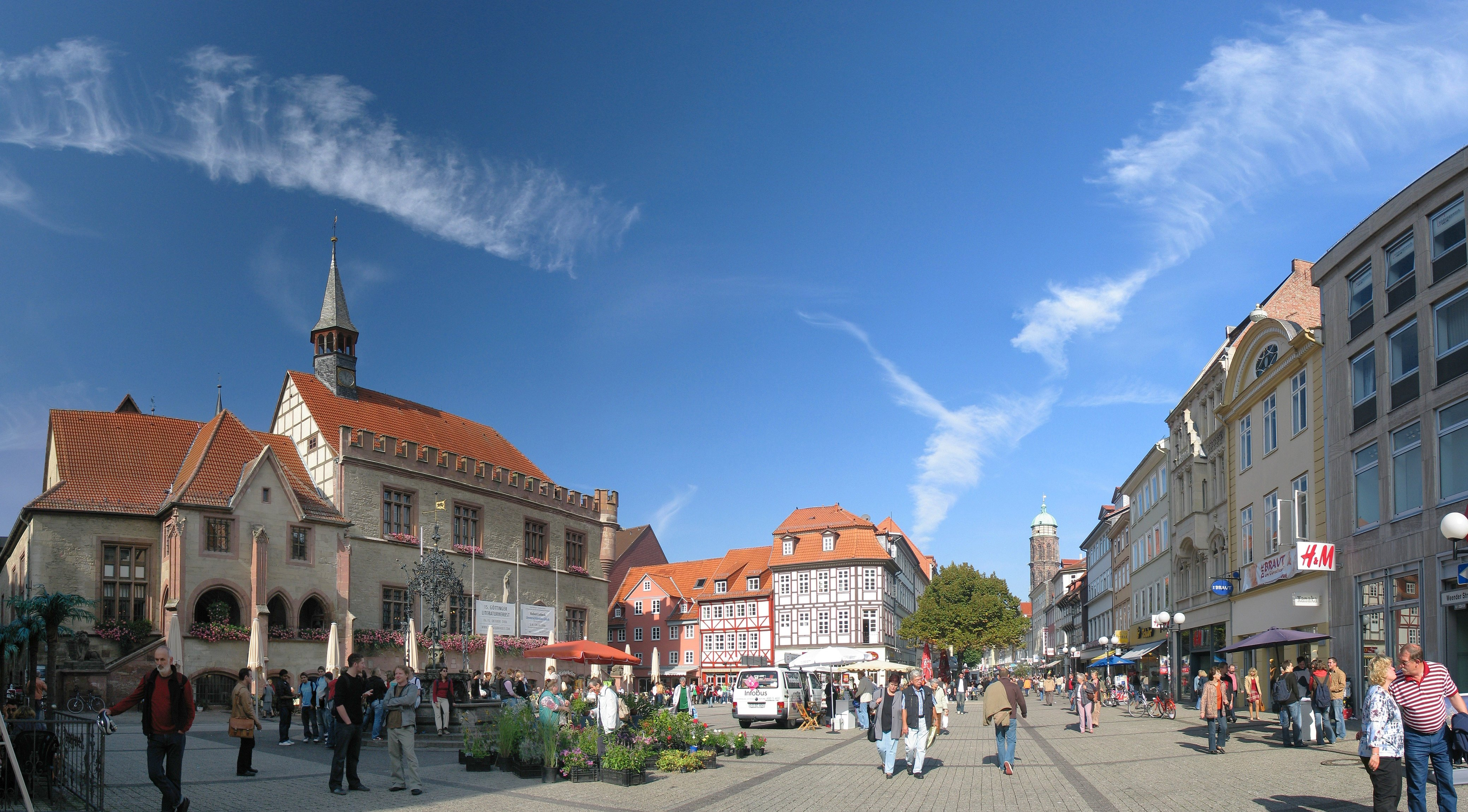
The Marktplatz in the centre of Goettingen town

The most famous tradition of the university is that PhD students who have just passed their Rigorosum (oral doctoral examination) or dissertation defense sit in a wagon – decorated with flowers and balloons and accompanied by relatives and friends, drive around the inner city and arrive at the Marktplatz – the central square where the old town hall and the Gänseliesel statue are located. The "newly born doctor" shall climb up to the statue of Gänseliesel (a poor princess in an old fairy tale who was compelled to keep geese by a wicked woman and later regained her identity), kiss the Gänseliesel and give bouquets to her.

== Student life ==
There is an old saying about life in Göttingen, still inscribed in Latin nowadays on the wall of the entrance to the Ratskeller (the restaurant located in the basement of the old town hall): Latin: Extra Gottingam non est vita, si est vita, non est ita (There is no life outside Göttingen. Even if it is life, it is no life like here).

Sign at Göttingen train station displaying the motto Stadt, die Wissen schafft ("City that creates knowledge", playing also with the German word "Wissenschaft", English "science")

"Ancient university towns are wonderfully alike. Göttingen is like Cambridge in England or Yale in America: very provincial, not on the way to anywhere – no one comes to these backwaters except for the company of professors. And the professors are sure that this is the centre of the world. There is an inscription in the Ratskeller there which reads 'Extra Gottingam non est vita', 'Outside Göttingen there is no life'. This epigram, or should I call it epitaph, is not taken as seriously by the undergraduates as by the professors."

— Bronowski, 1973, The Ascent of Man, p. 360

The university offers eight snack shops and six Mensas serving lunch at low prices for the students. One Mensa also provides dinner for students.

== Notable people ==
Apart from those celebrities mentioned above, notable people that have studied or taught at Georg-August University include the American banker J. P. Morgan, the seismologist Beno Gutenberg, the endocrinologist Hakaru Hashimoto, who studied there before World War I, and several notable Nobel laureates like Max Planck and Werner Heisenberg. Anthropologist Marlina Flassy earned her doctorate in Göttingen, before becoming the first woman and indigenous Papuan to be appointed Dean at Cenderawasih University. The German inventor of the jet engine, Pabst von Ohain, also studied aerodynamics under Ludwig Prandtl.

Past prominent professors and students of the University of Göttingen

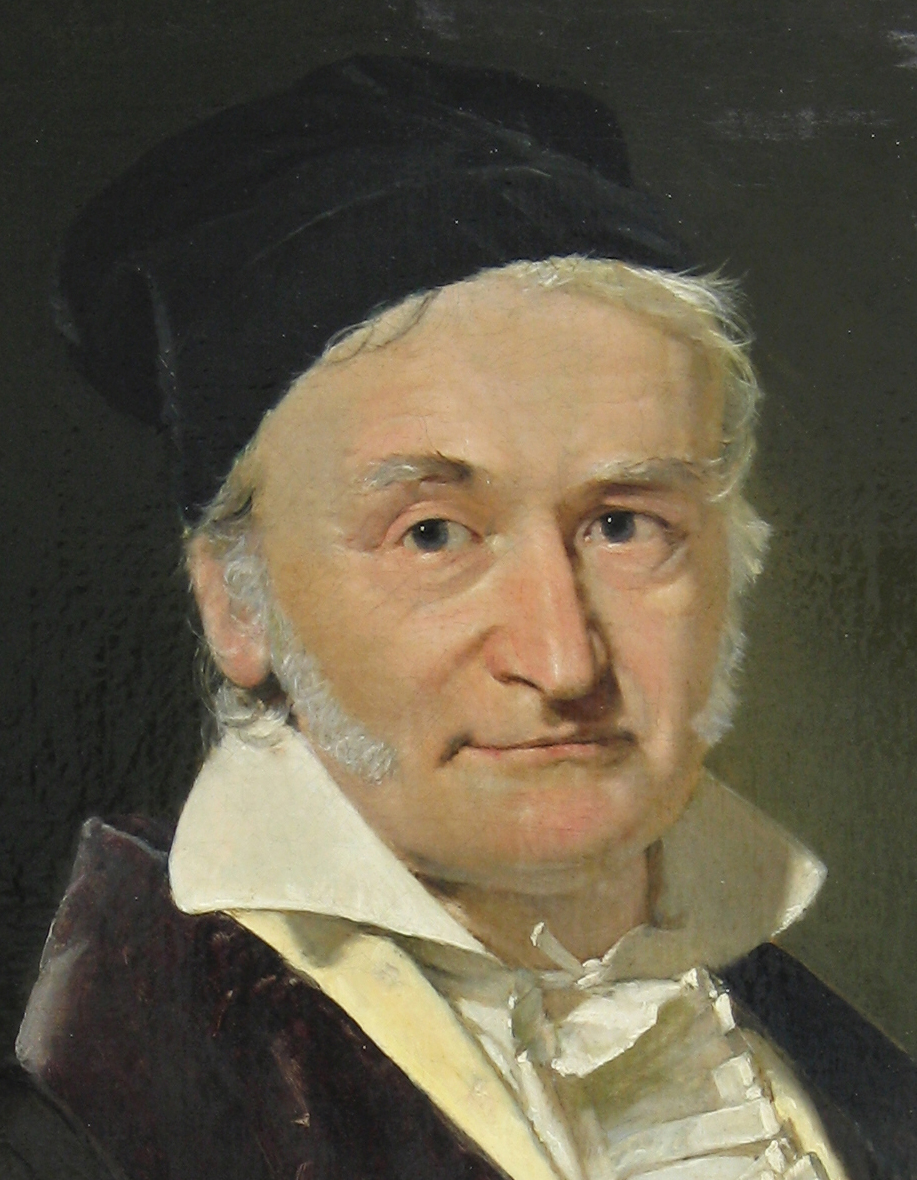
Johann Carl Friedrich Gauss, "Prince of Mathematicians"

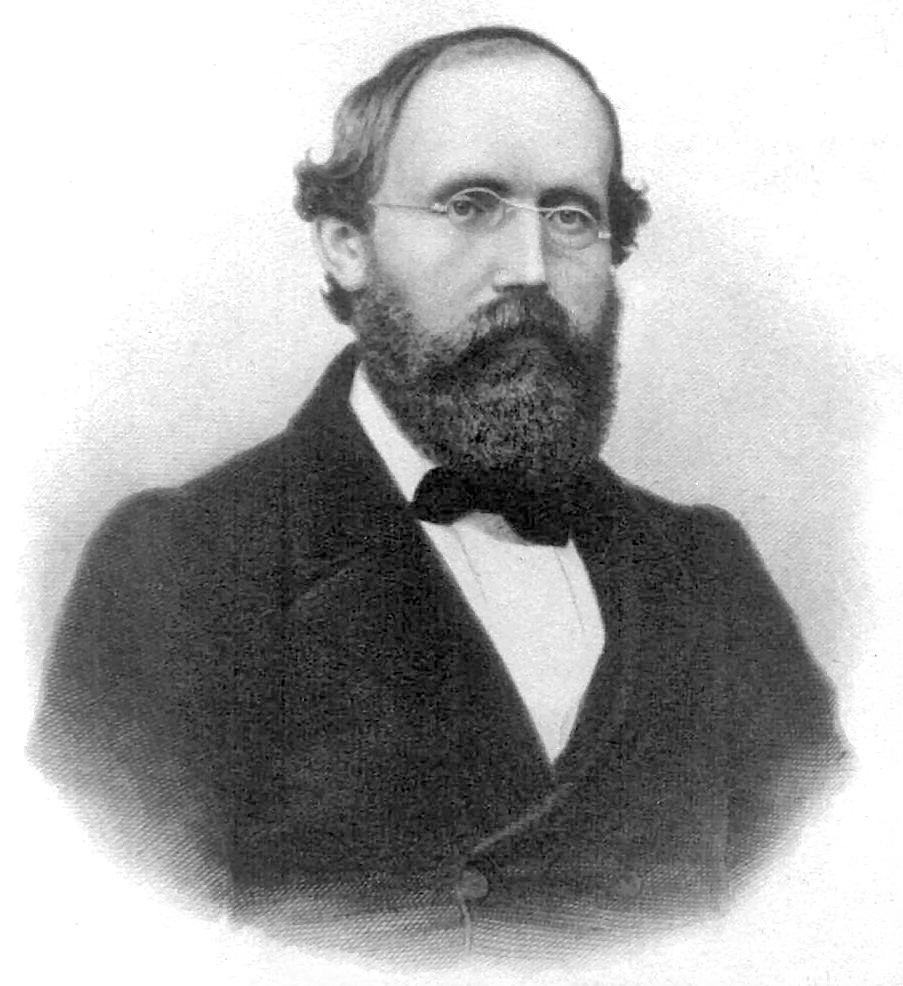
Bernhard Riemann, Mathematician

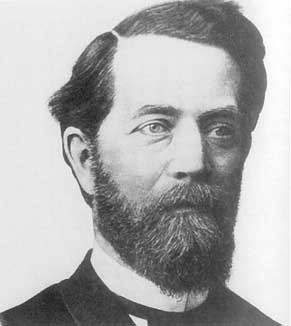
Felix Klein, Mathematician

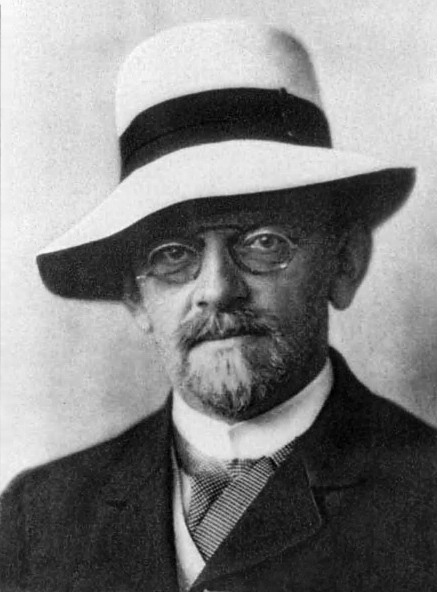
David Hilbert, Mathematician

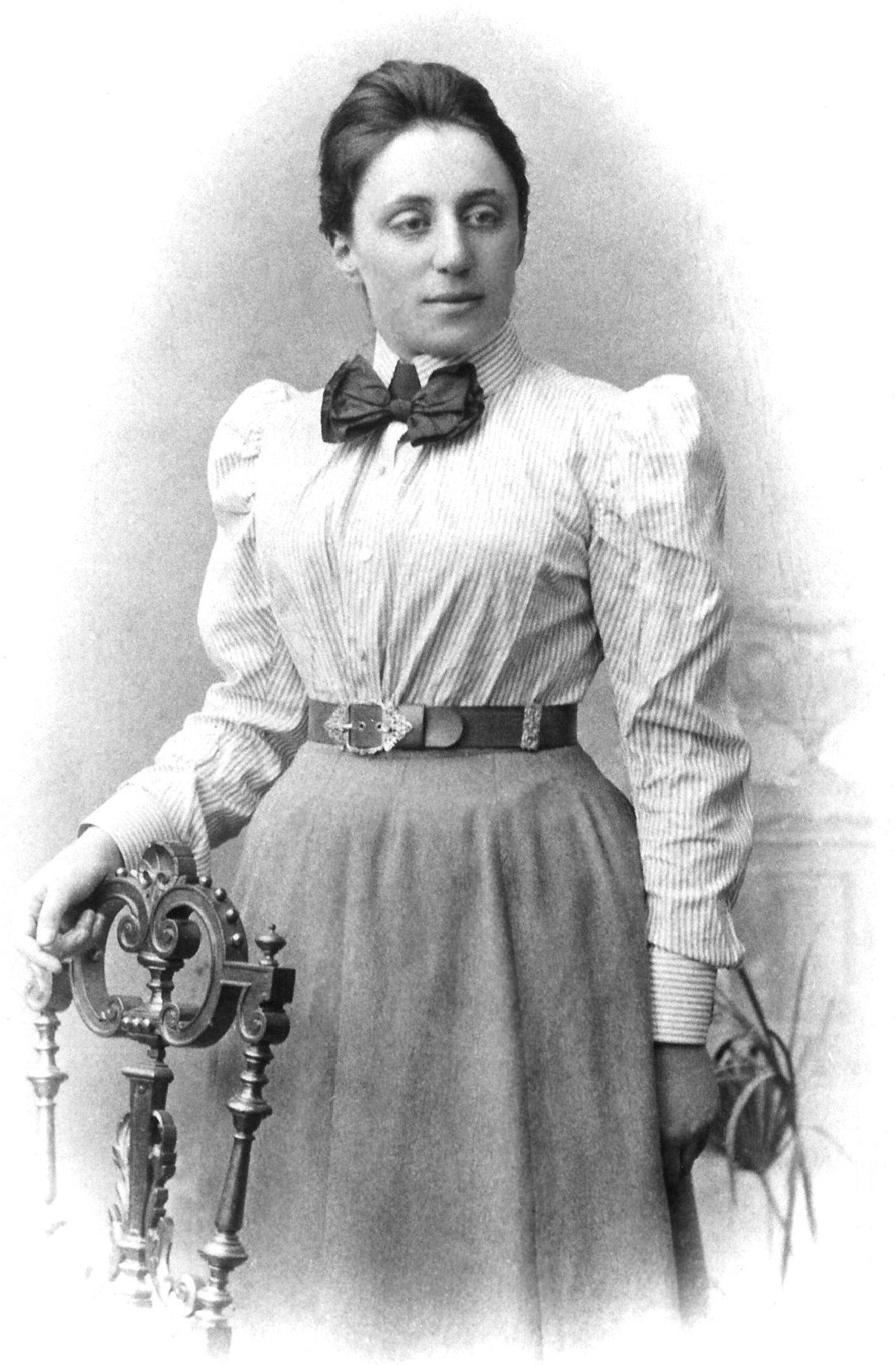
Emmy Noether, Mathematician

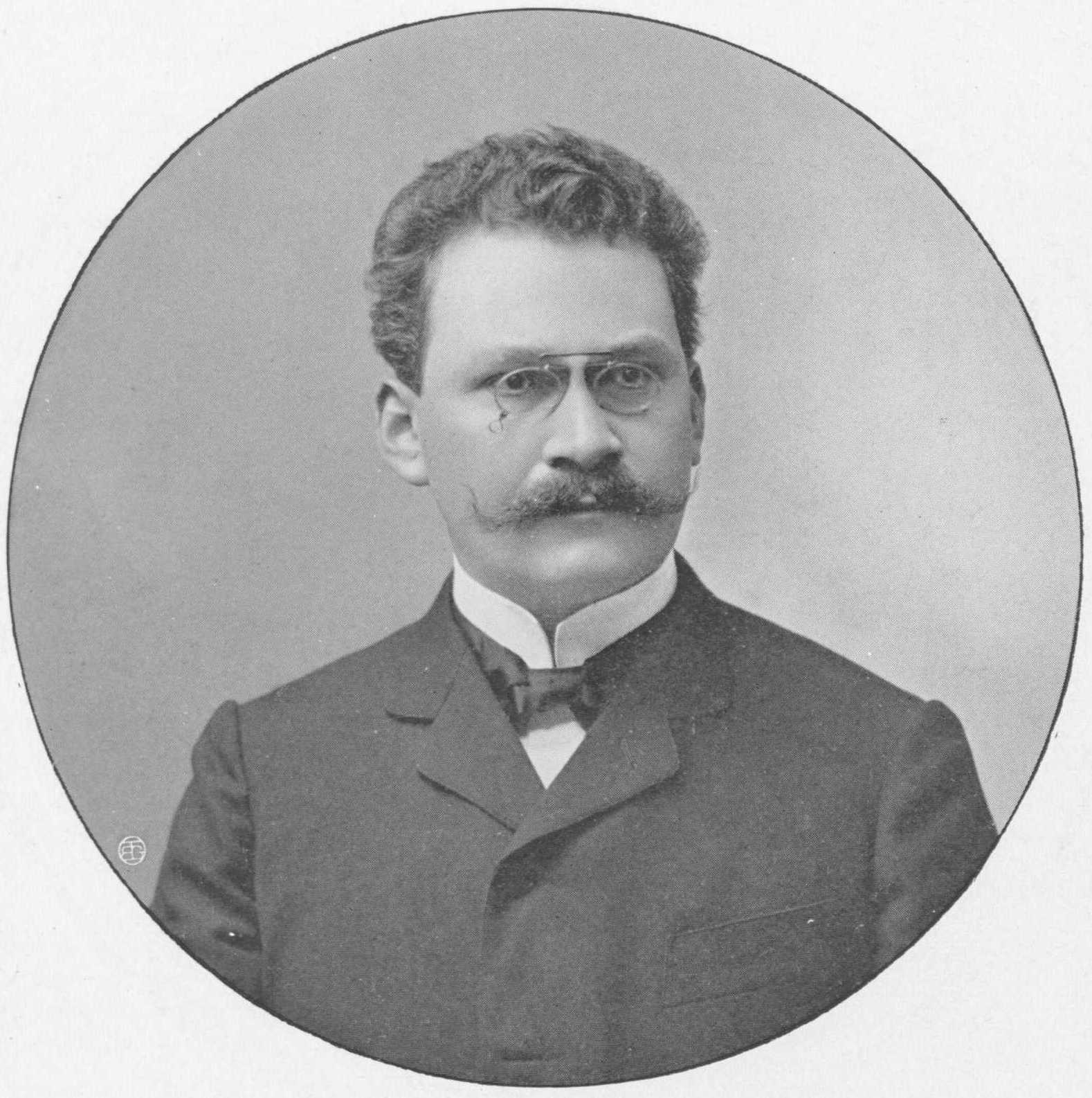
Hermann Minkowski, Mathematician, one of Albert Einstein's teachers

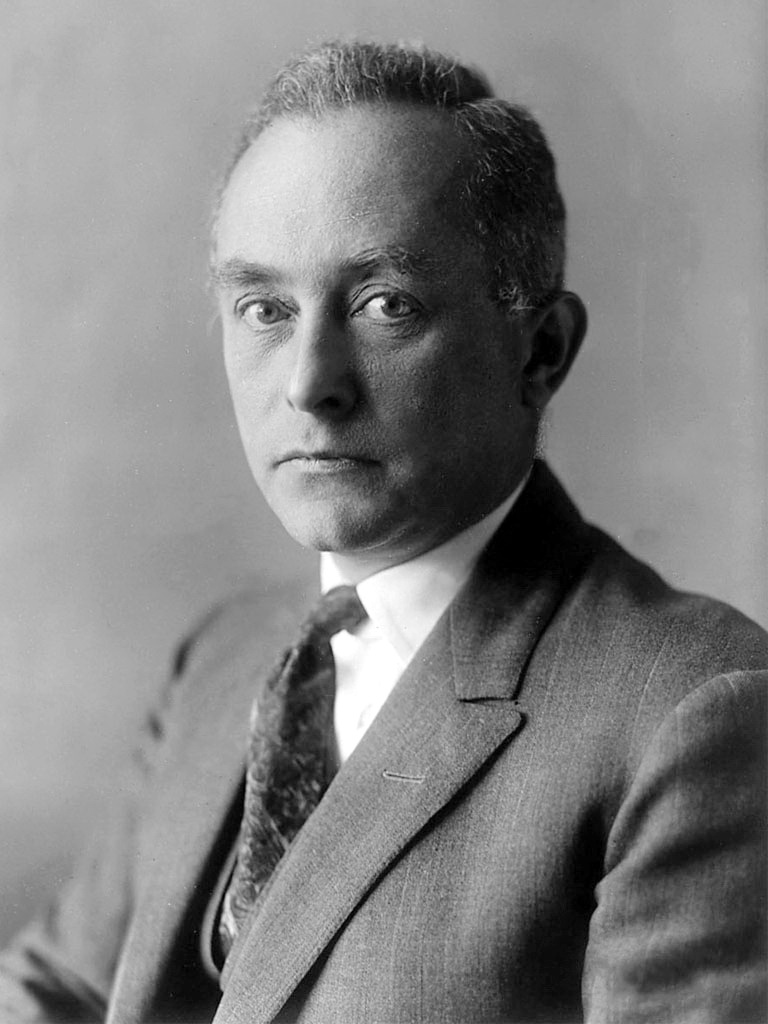
Max Born, Physicist, 1954 Nobel Prize in Physics

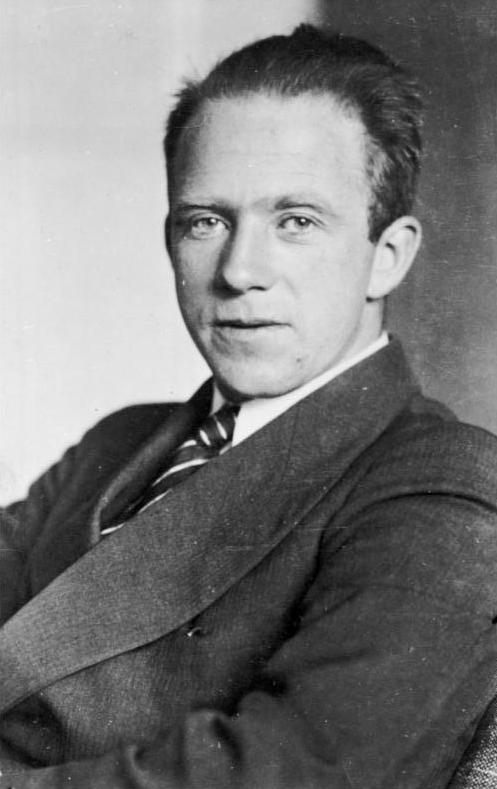
Werner Heisenberg, Physicist, 1932 Nobel Prize in Physics

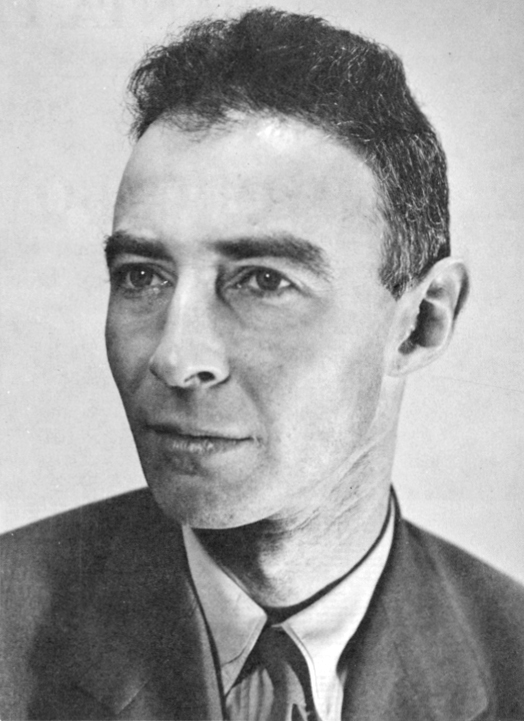
Robert Oppenheimer, Physicist, "Father of the atomic bomb"

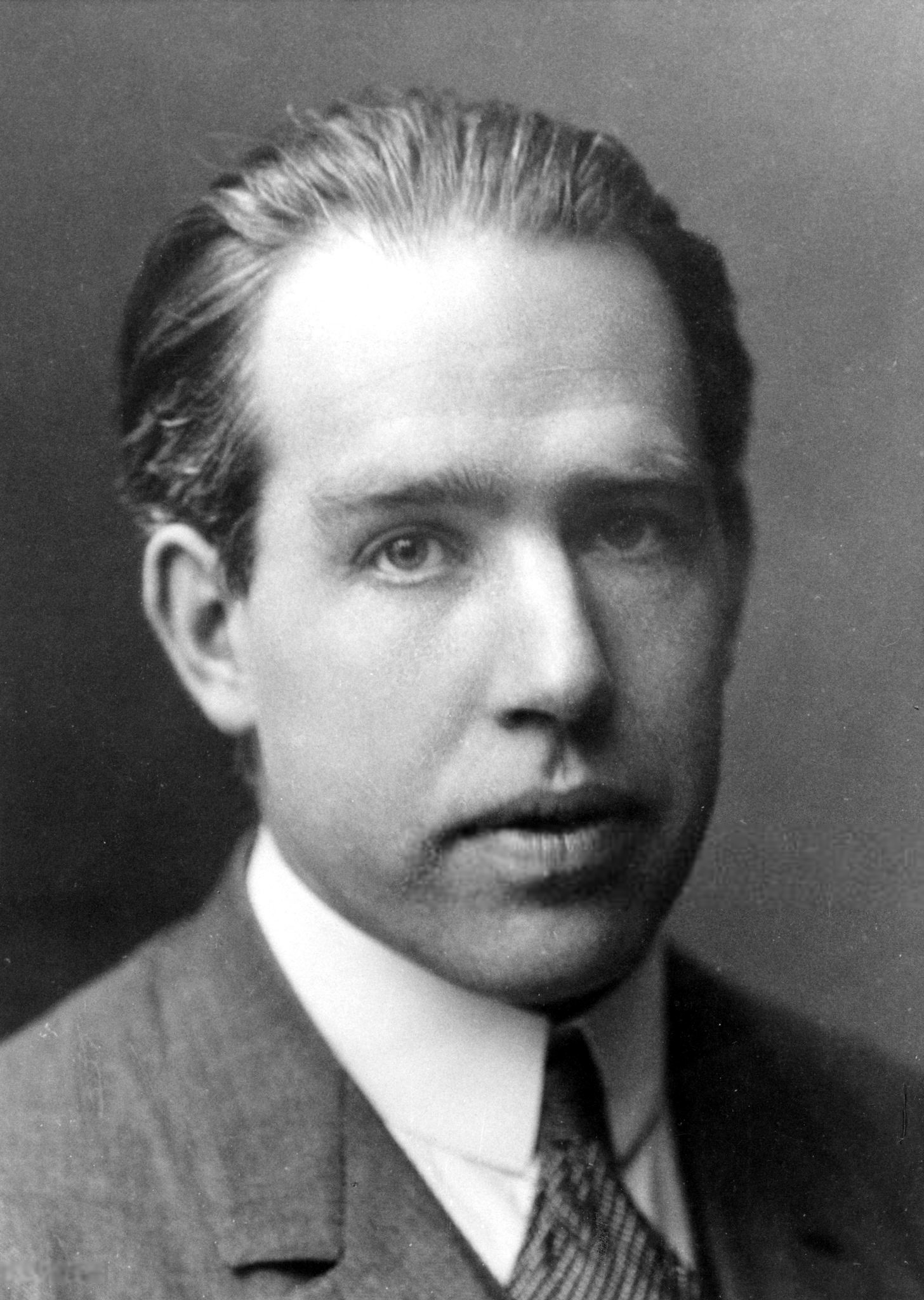
Niels Bohr, Physicist, 1922 Nobel Prize in Physics

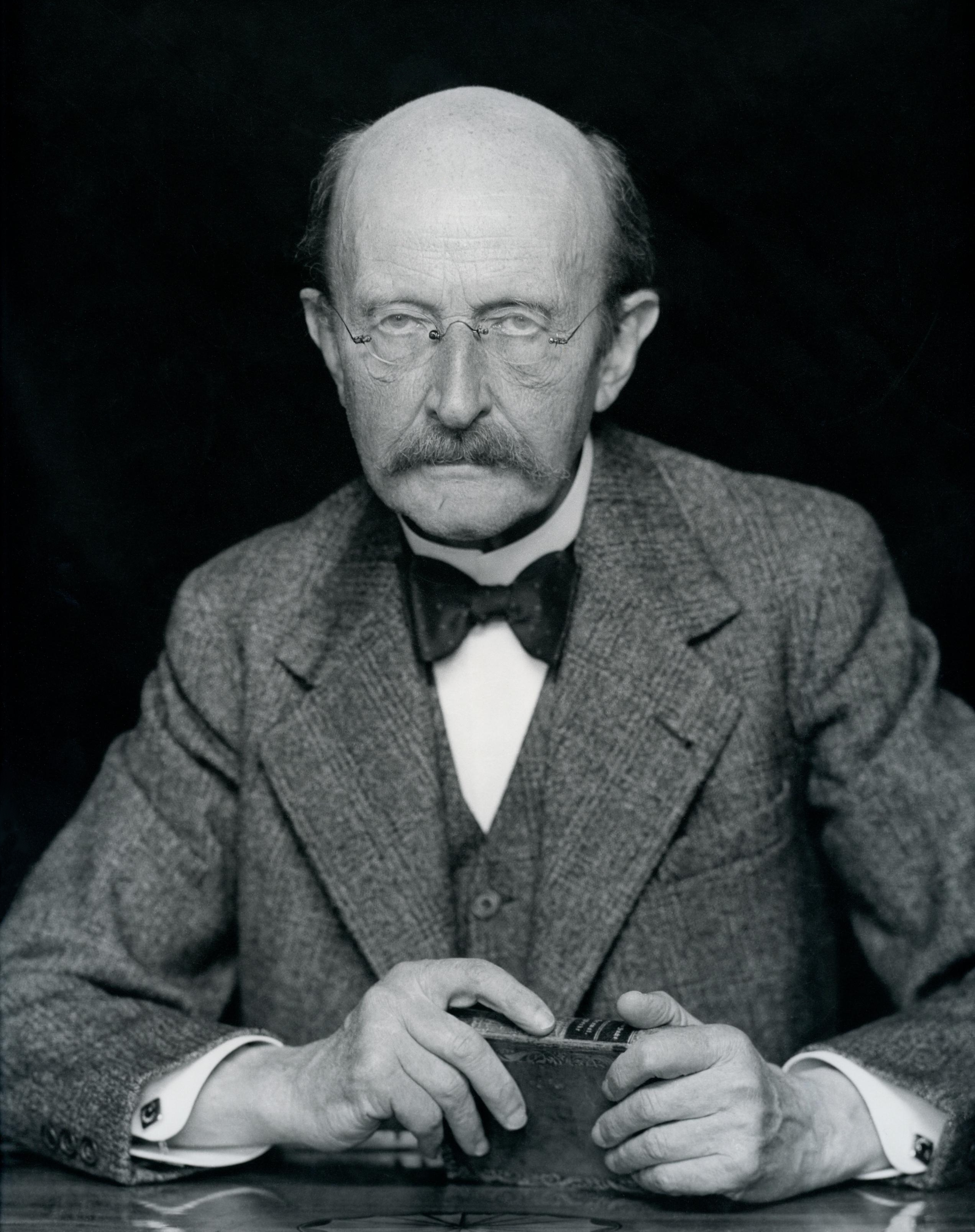
Max Planck, Physicist, 1918 Nobel Prize in Physics

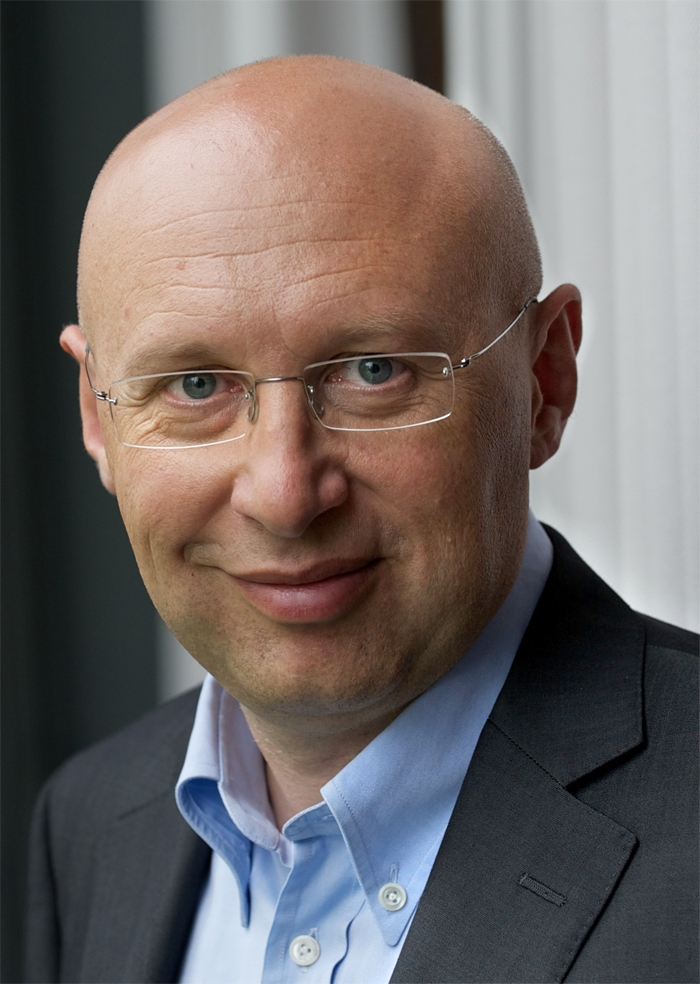
Stefan Hell, Physicist, 2014 Nobel Prize in Chemistry

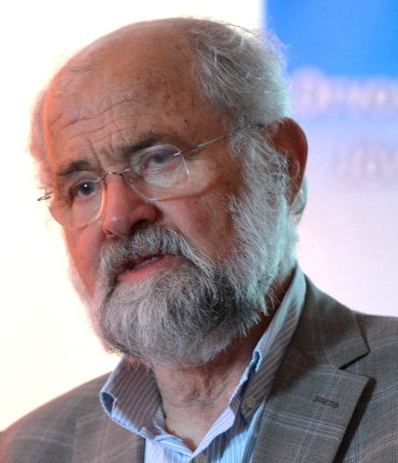
Erwin Neher, Biophysicist, 1991 Nobel Prize in Physiology or Medicine

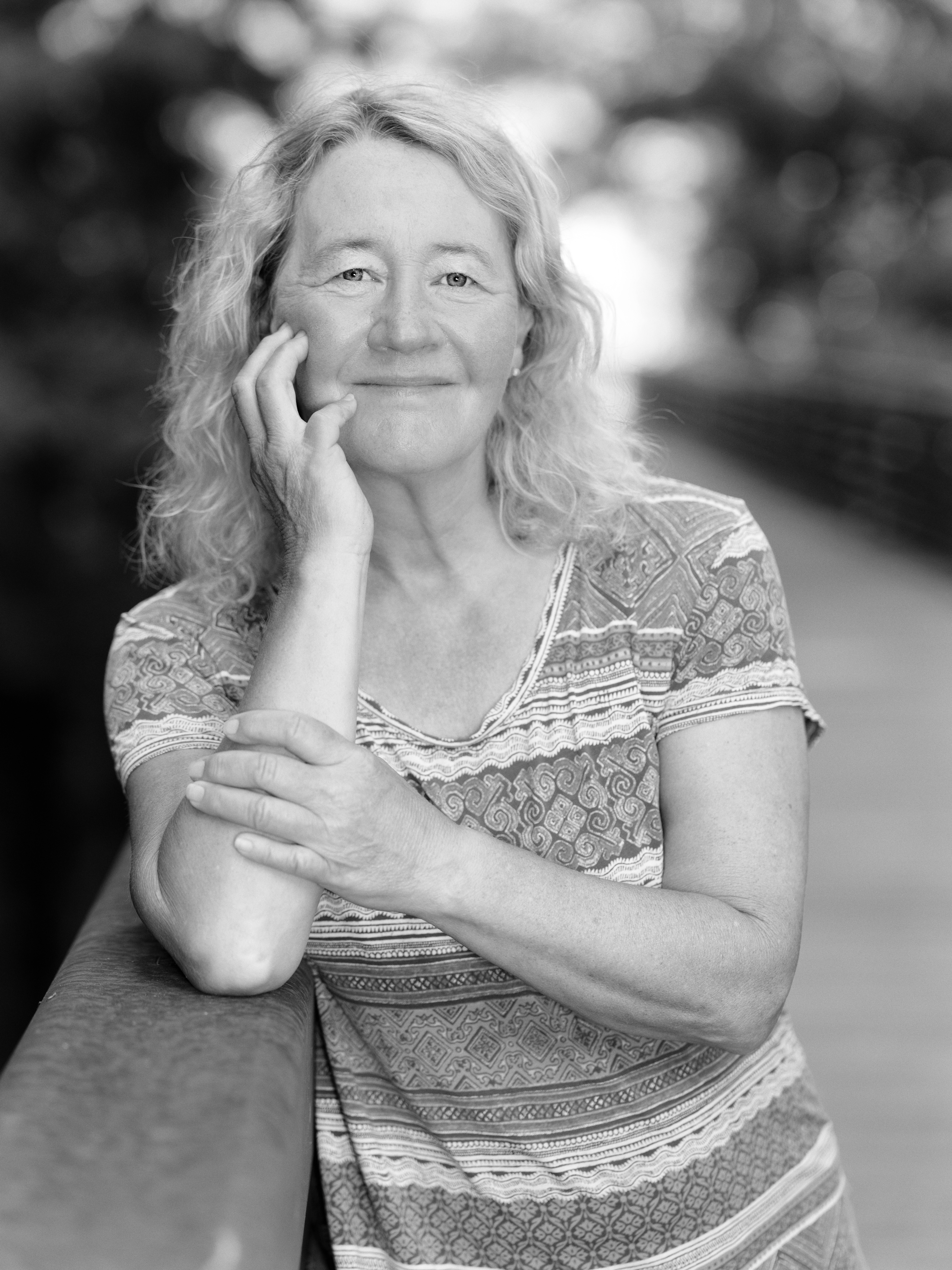
Carol W. Greider, Biochemist, 2009 Nobel Prize in Physiology or Medicine

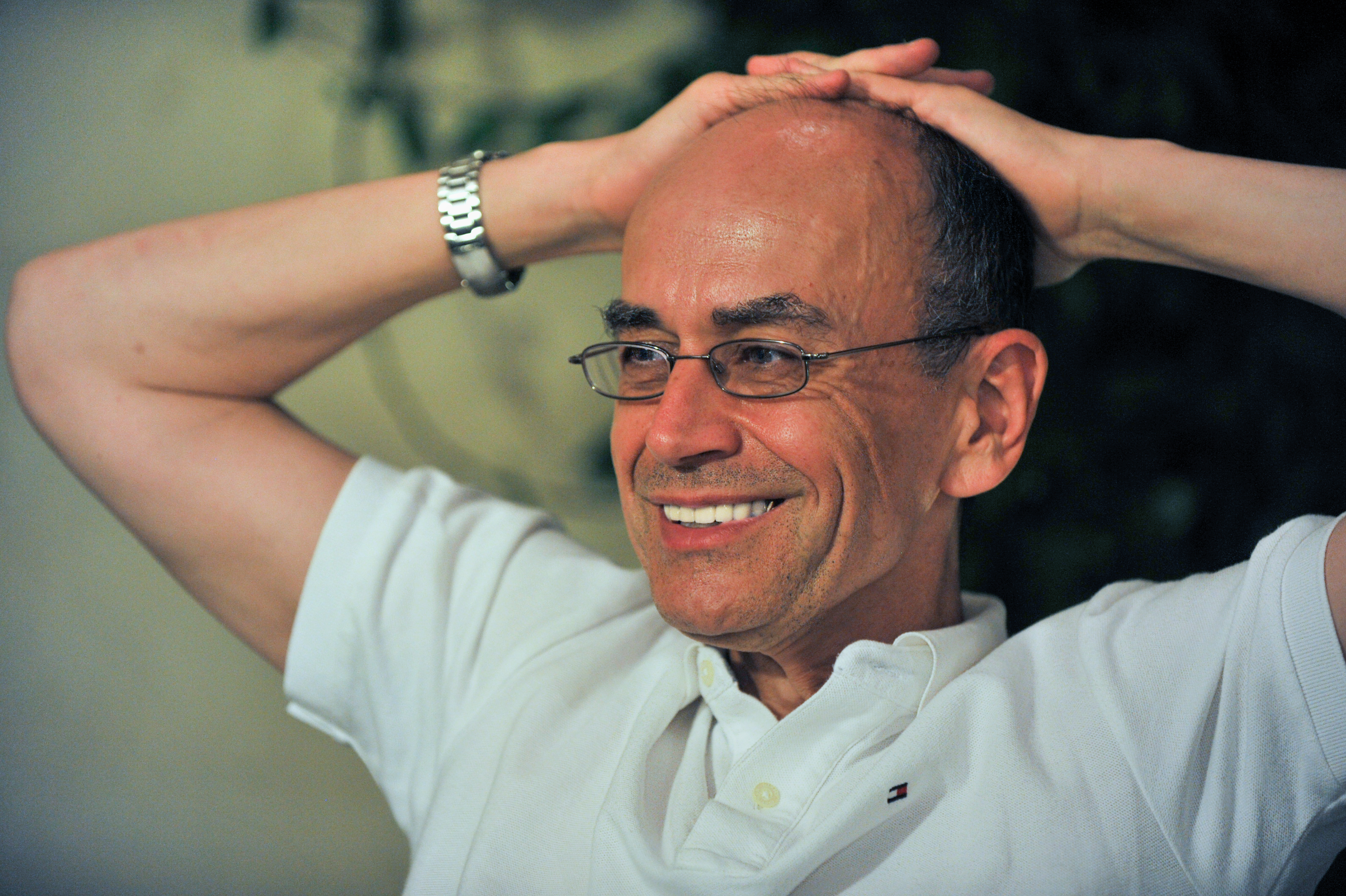
Thomas Südhof, Molecular biologist, 2013 Nobel Prize in Physiology or Medicine

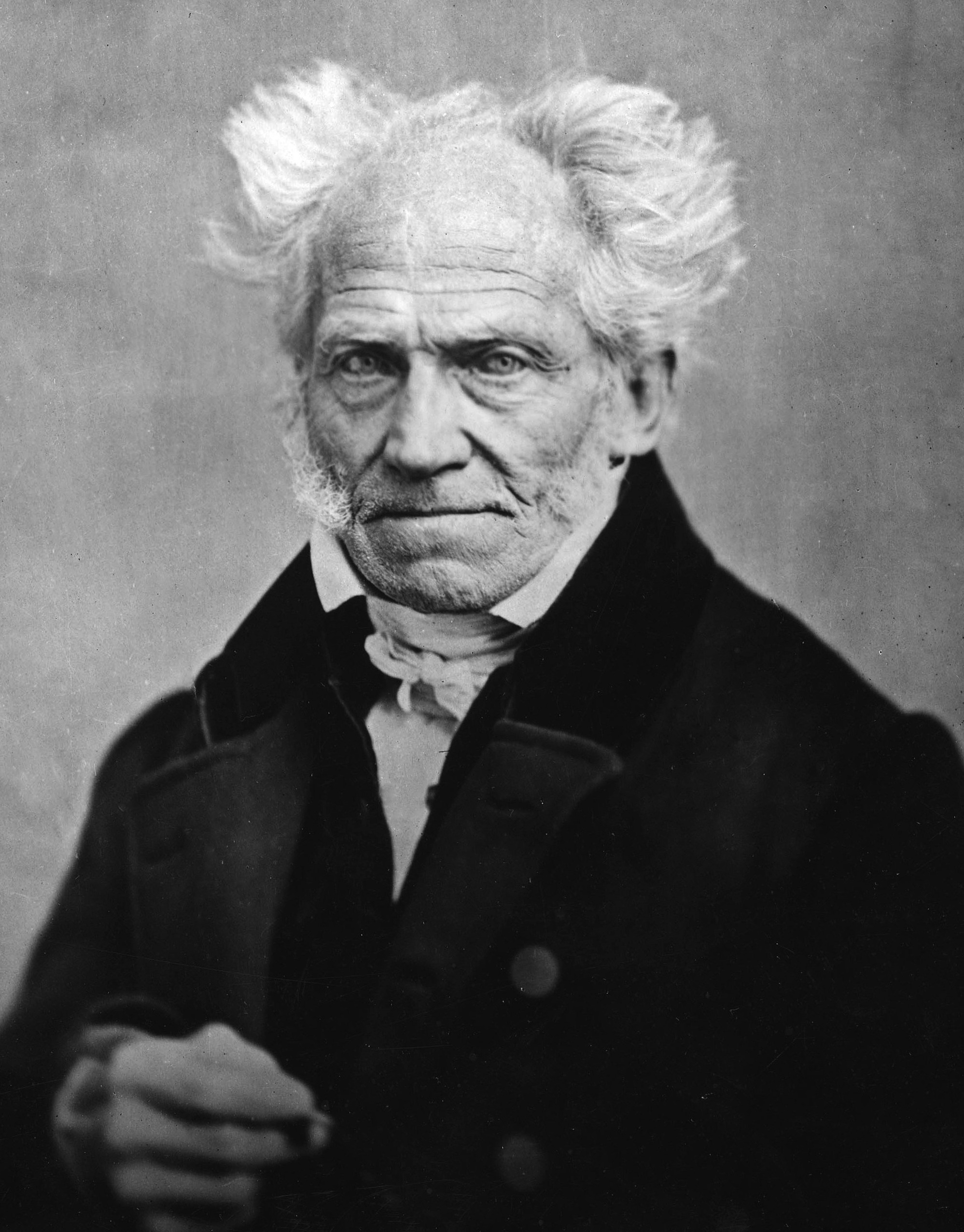
Arthur Schopenhauer, Philosopher

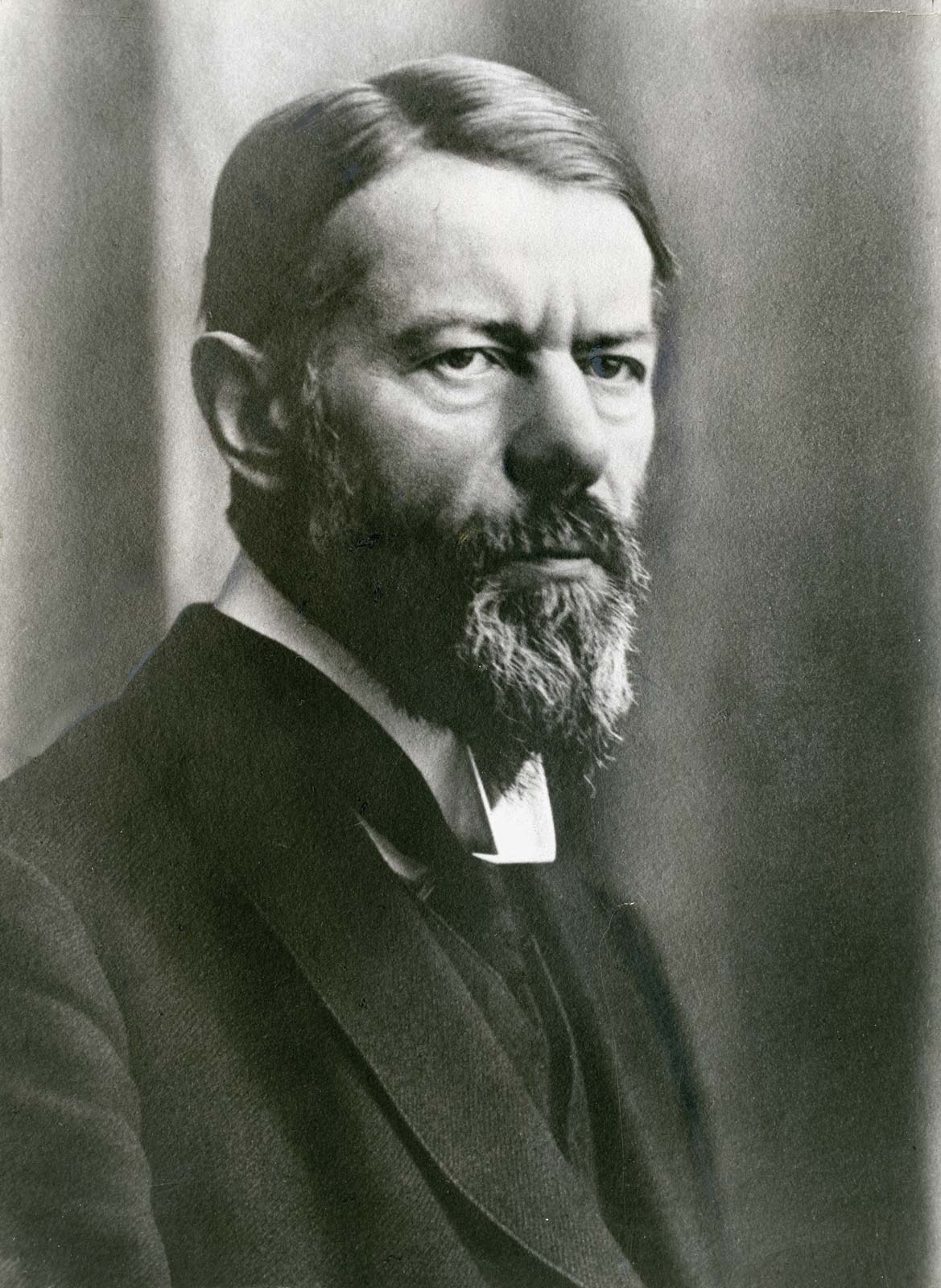
Max Weber, Sociologist, historian, jurist, and political economist

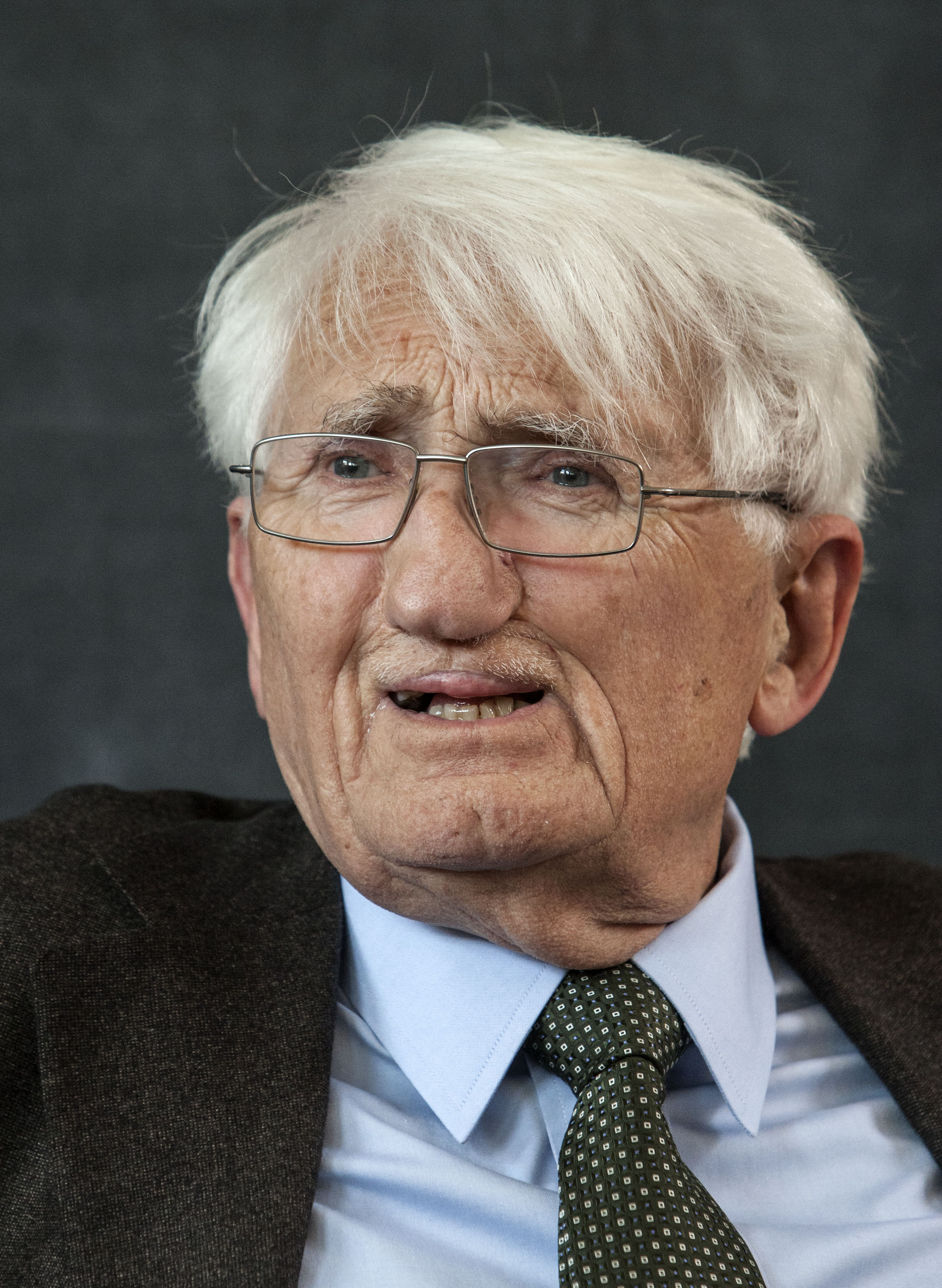
Jürgen Habermas, Philosopher and social theorist

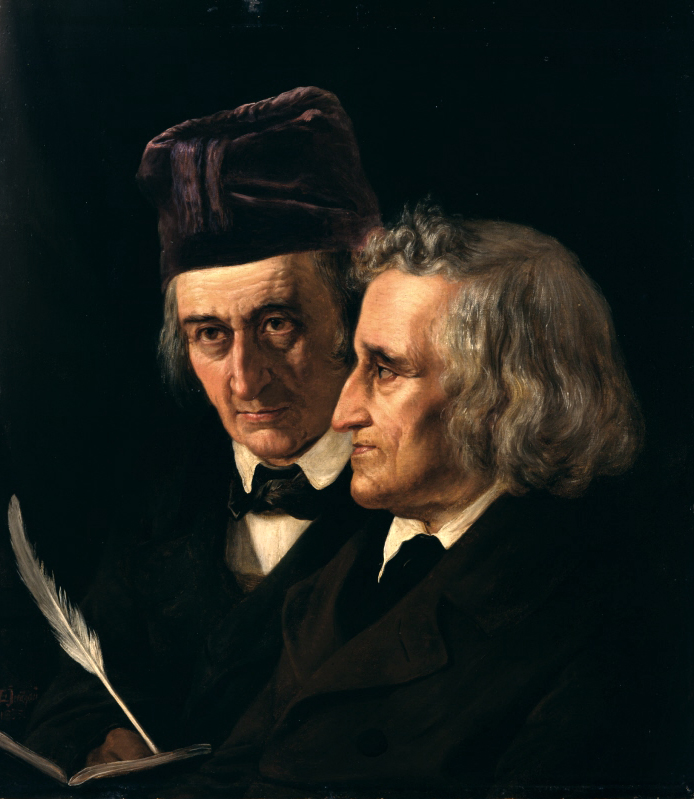
Brothers Grimm, writers and storytellers of folktales

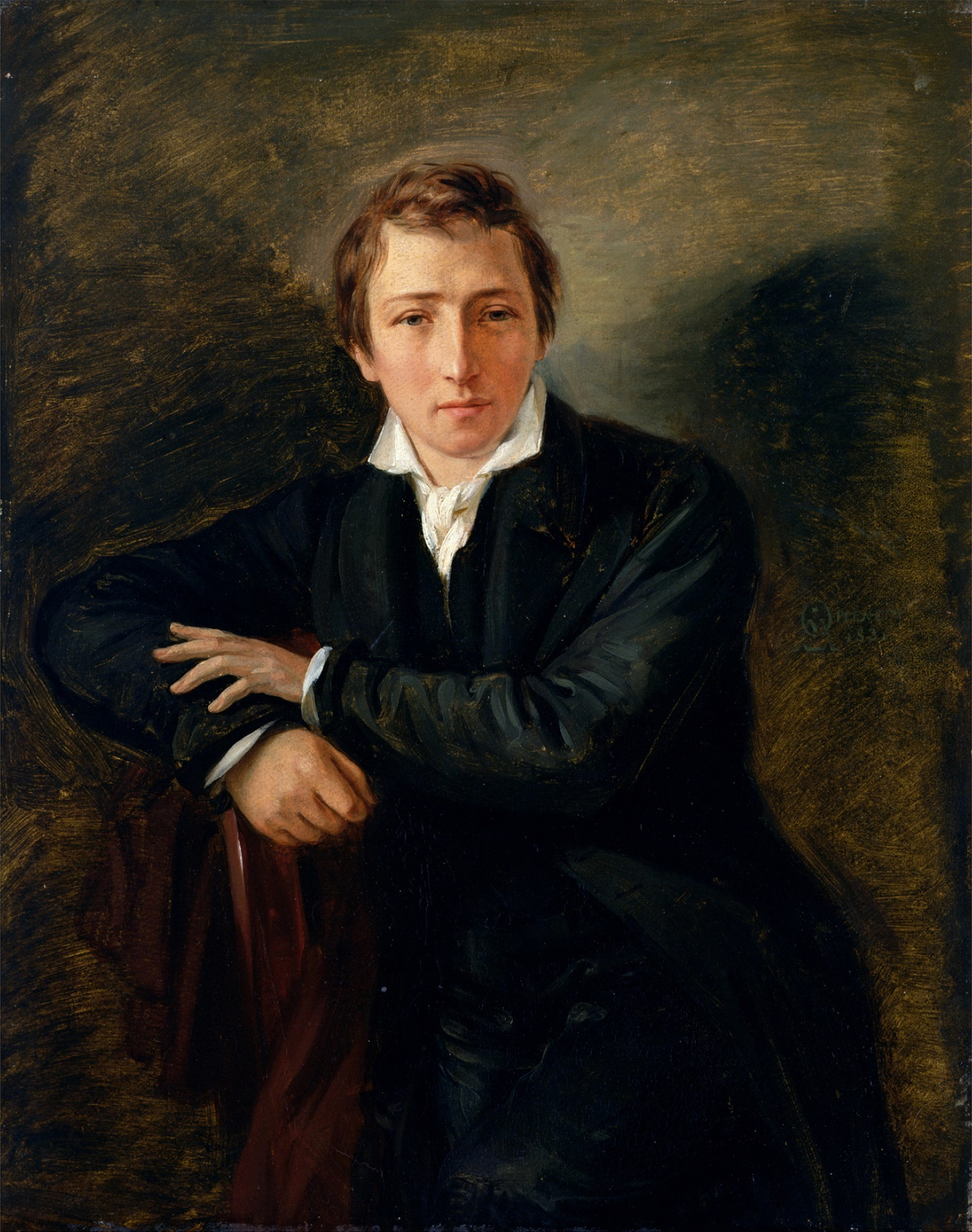
Heinrich Heine, Poet, writer and literary critic

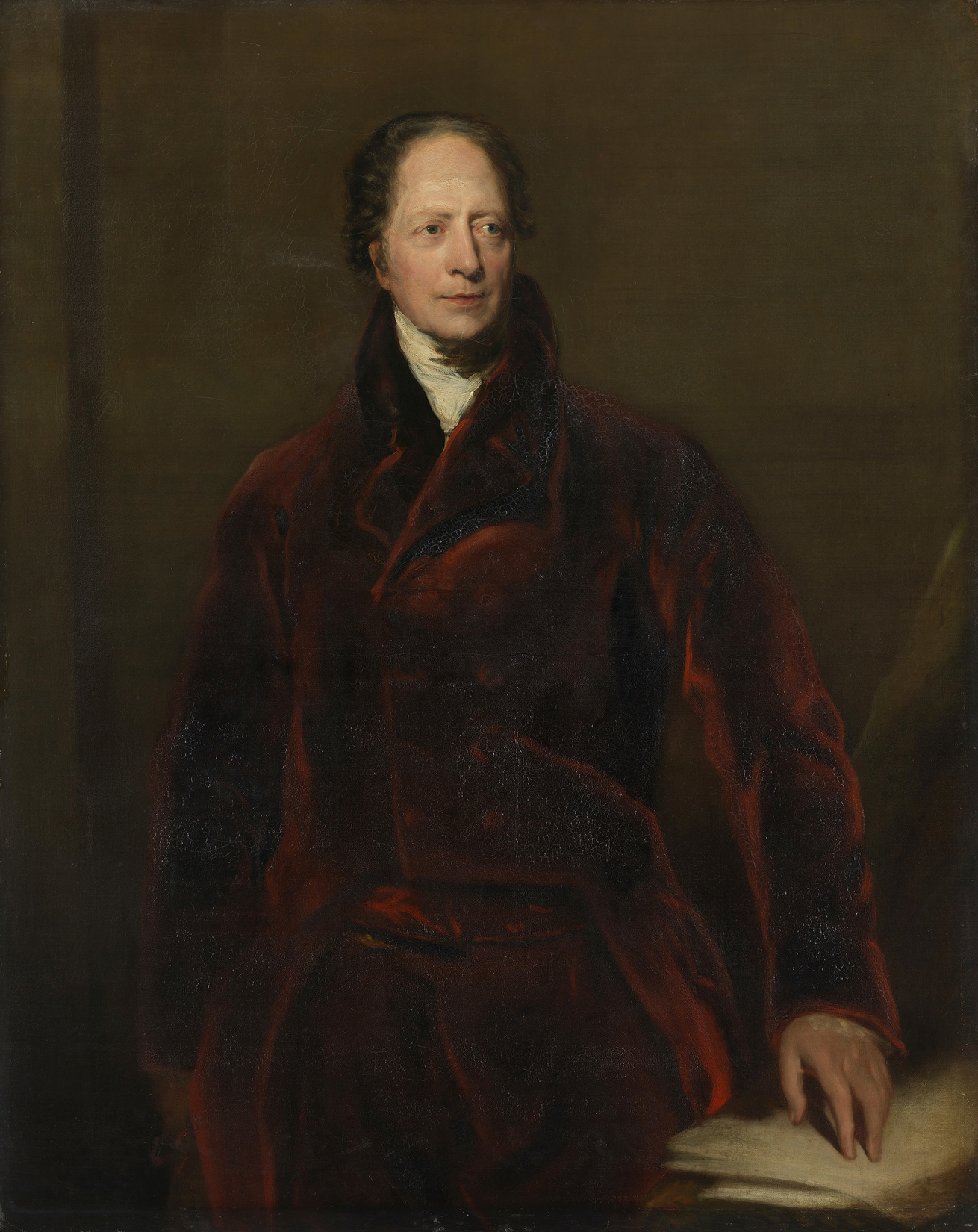
Wilhelm von Humboldt, Founder of the Humboldt University of Berlin

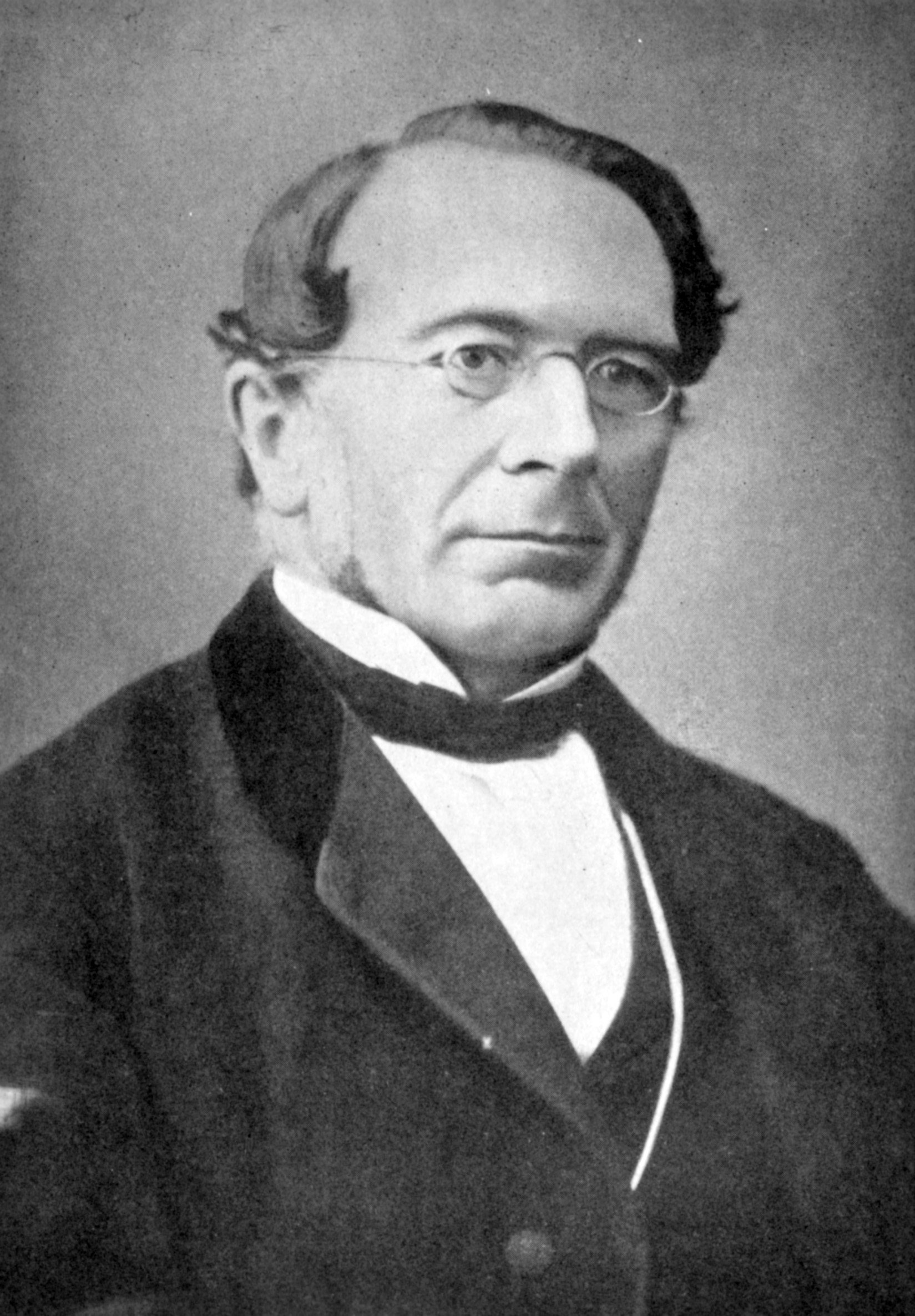
Rudolf von Jhering, Jurist

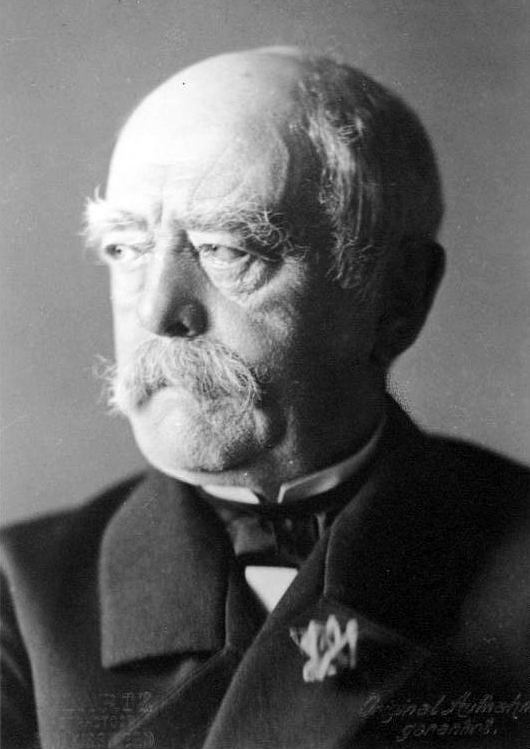
Otto von Bismarck, "Iron Chancellor" of the German Empire

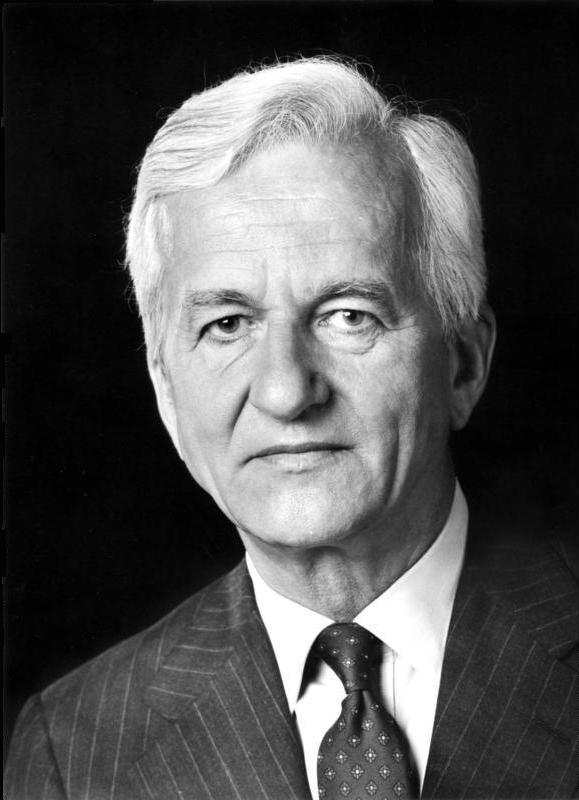
Richard von Weizsäcker, Former President of Germany

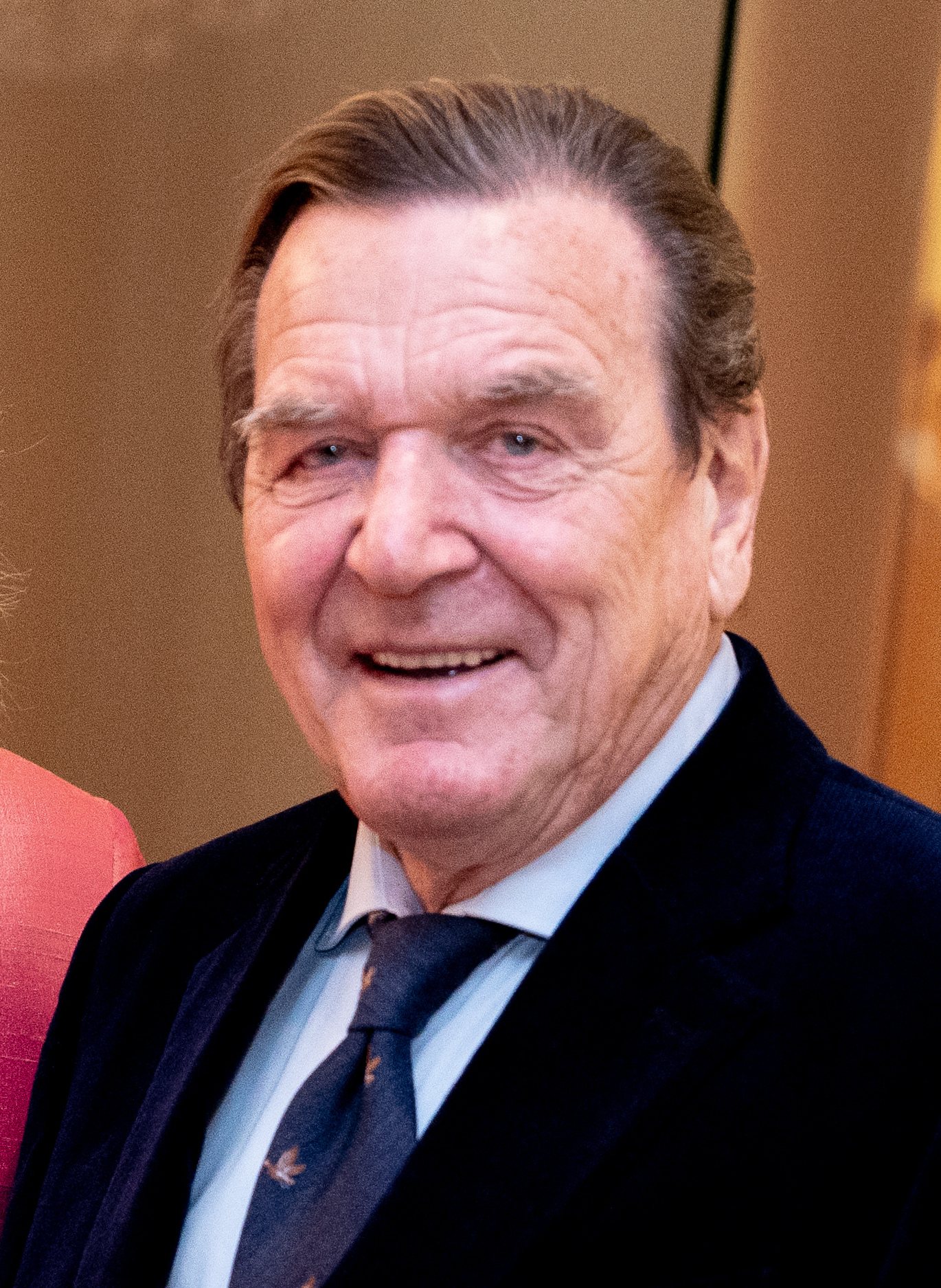
Gerhard Schröder, Former Chancellor of Germany

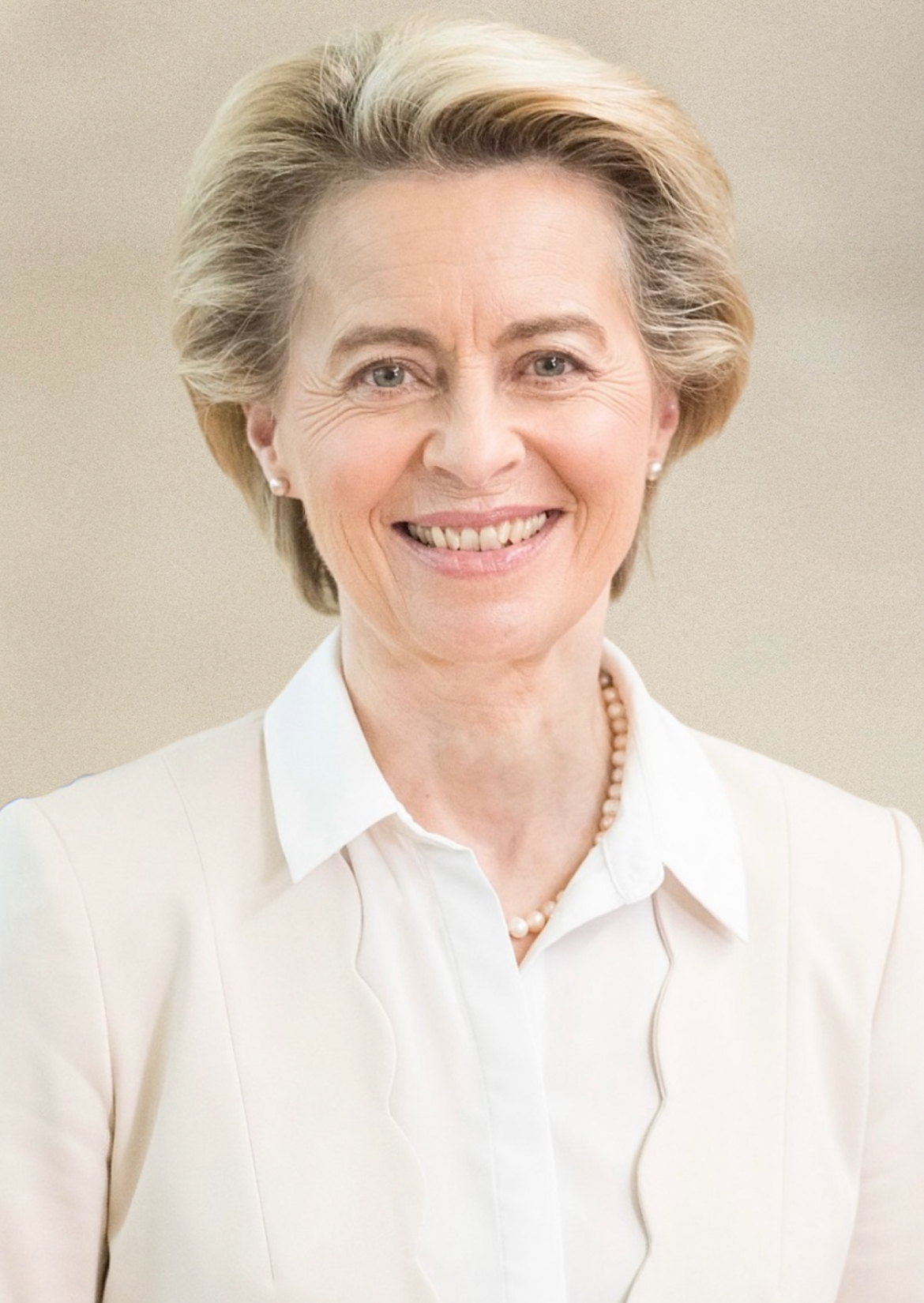
Ursula von der Leyen, President of the European Commission

== See also ==
- Göttinger Digitalisierungszentrum
- List of early modern universities in Europe
- List of universities in Germany
- List of forestry universities and colleges
