= The Göttingen Campus =

The Göttingen Campus official logo

The Göttingen Campus is an alliance between the University of Göttingen including the University Medical Centre Göttingen and eight non-university, local research institutions, five of which are Max Planck Institutes. The Göttingen Campus partners foster research, teaching, and the training of early career researchers.

== History ==
The Göttingen Campus partnership has been developed by its members over many years. Because of the high density or research and education institutions in Göttingen, academic collaborations across institutional boundaries are very common. The formalization of this collaborative work all began with joint International Max Planck Research Schools, followed by joint institutions such as the European Neuroscience Institute. The Göttingen Campus Council (formerly Göttingen research Council) was established in 2006 as the main governing body for the Campus. It identifies Campus-wide research priorities and facilitates cooperation between Campus members.

== Objectives ==
The Göttingen Campus works to further improve the quality of research and teaching and to use synergies in the areas of management, administration and infrastructures. Equality, diversity and family-friendliness are promoted in order to create ideal working conditions for scientific and science-support staff. Academic cooperations and joint research networks are being supported and expanded, and there is an increasing number of shared infrastructure across the Campus.

== Joint activities and infrastructure ==
- Collaboration in more than 50 research projects, including the Cluster of Excellence Nanoscale Microscopy and Molecular Physiology of the Brain (CNMPB).
- Joint research centre European Neuroscience Institute Göttingen (ENI-G).
- Shared data centre for the Göttingen Campus, based on a joint enterprise of the University of Göttingen and the Max Planck Society: "Gesellschaft für wissenschaftliche Datenverarbeitung mbh Göttingen (GWDG)"
- Campus Laboratory "Campus Laboratory for Advanced Imaging, Microscopy and Spectroscopy (AIMS)" supporting the development of innovative methods and connecting researchers of the Göttingen Campus across institutes and disciplines.
- Göttingen Campus Event Calendar: an online platform listing all events, lectures and conferences across the Göttingen Campus.
- Night of Science ("Nacht des Wissens") a biannual public event organized by all Campus members to bring the activities and knowledge of the Campus closer to the general public.
- Göttingen Campus Postdoc Network: an umbrella organization that links all postdocs across the whole Campus.

== Members ==
- University of Göttingen
- University Medical Centre Göttingen
- Göttingen Academy of Sciences and Humanities
- German Aerospace Center
- German Primate Center
- Max Planck Institute for Biophysical Chemistry
- Max Planck Institute for Dynamics and Self-Organization
- Max Planck Institute of Experimental Medicine
- Max Planck Institute for Solar System Research
- Max Planck Institute for the Study of Religious and Ethnic Diversity

== Associate partners ==
- Georg Eckert Institute (GEI)
- HAWK University of Applied Sciences and Arts
- Herzog August Library
- KWS SAAT SE
- Laser-Laboratorium Göttingen e.V. (LLG)
- Northwest German Forest Research Institute (NW-FVA)
- Otto Bock HealthCare GmbH
- PFH Private University of Applied Sciences
- PHYWE Systeme GmbH & Co. KG
- Sartorius AG
- Volkswagen AG
