= Göttingen University Faculty of Law =

Faculty of Law, Göttingen University
- Type: Public university
- Established: 1737; 289 years ago
- Location: Göttingen, Niedersachsen, Germany
- Dean: Andreas Paulus
- Website: Faculty Website

Faculty of Law, Göttingen University is the Faculty of Law of University of Göttingen in Göttingen, Niedersachsen, Germany. Established in 1737, the faculty of law belongs to one of the four founding faculties of the university. It offers the Dipl.-Jur., LL.M. and Dr. jur. degrees in law. It also hosts visiting scholars and several legal research centers.

The Faculty of Law has been a cradle for many distinguished legal scholars and public luminaries. The leading German legal scholar Rudolf von Jhering taught here in the late 19th century. Lassa Francis Lawrence Oppenheim, widely known as the founding father of modern international law, earned his doctorate in law in Göttingen in 1881. When it comes to politicians, Otto von Bismarck, "Iron Chancellor" of the second German Empire once studied law in Göttingen. Richard von Weizsäcker, a late German President, obtained his doctorate in law (Dr.iur.) from the Faculty of Law at the University of Göttingen in 1955. Gerhard Schröder, a former German Chancellor, also studied law in Göttingen and became a lawyer thereafter. Even the famous German poet Heinrich Heine received his doctorate in law here in 1825.

== History ==
Throughout the 18th century, the University of Göttingen was ranked highly among German universities for its liberal attitude and atmosphere of scientific exploration and research. Napoleon studied law there and stated that "Göttingen belongs neither to a State, nor to Germany, and is the University of Europe".

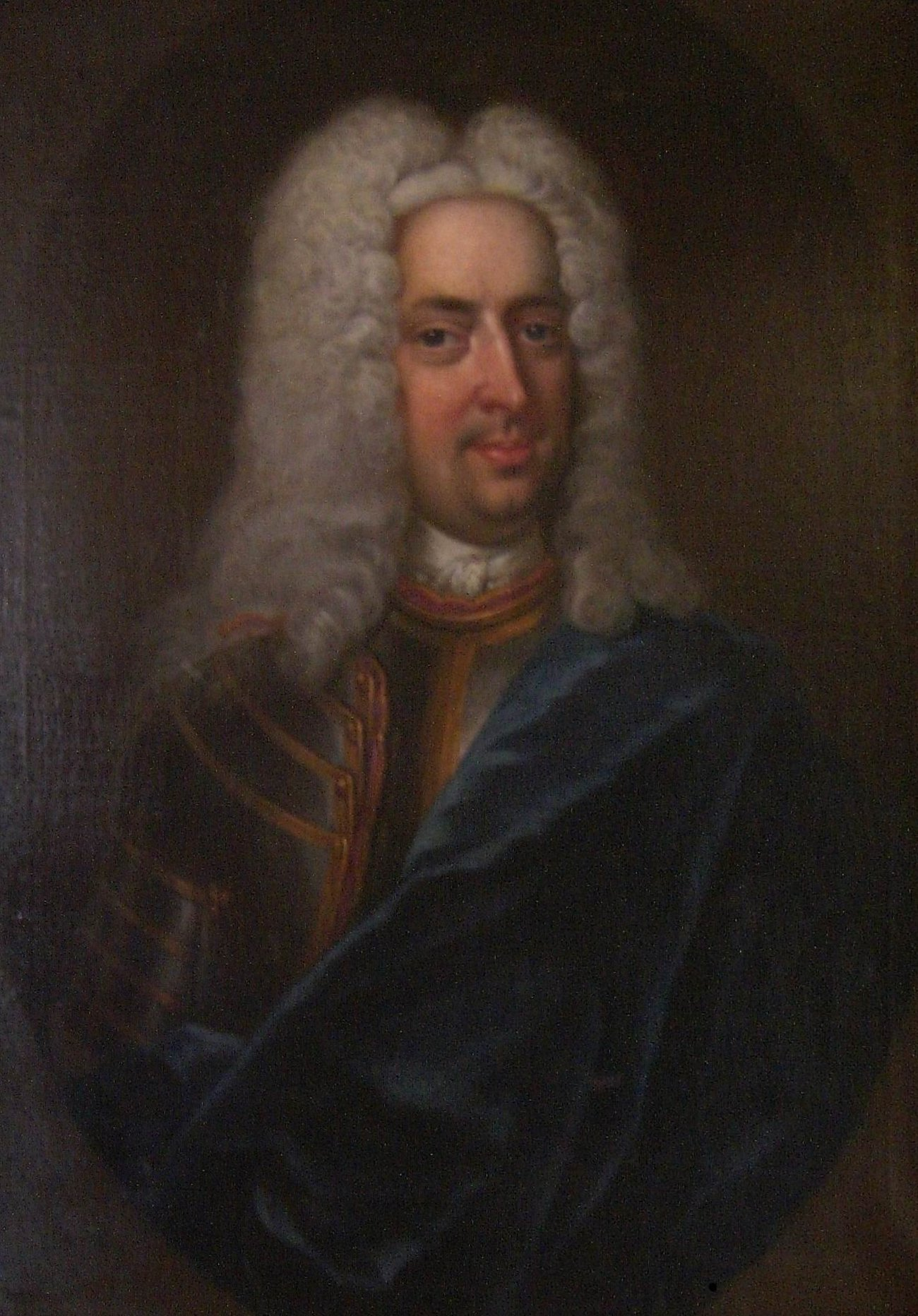
Gerlach von Münchhausen, the founder of the faculty in 1737

In the first years of the University of Göttingen, it became known especially for its Faculty of Law. In the 18th century Johann Stephan Pütter, a scholar of public law at that time, taught jus publicum for half a century. The subject had attracted students such as Klemens Wenzel Lothar von Metternich, later diplomat and Prime Minister of Austria, and Wilhelm von Humboldt, who later established the University of Berlin. At the beginning of the 19th century, Gustav Hugo and Karl Friedrich Eichhorn, who taught law here, became the pioneers of the German Historical School of Jurisprudence. These jurists contributed to the reputation of the Faculty of Law. At the time, Göttingen was a very popular place for the study of law in Germany: Even the great German poet Heinrich Heine obtained a doctorate in law here in 1825. Otto von Bismarck, the main creator and the first Chancellor of the second German Empire, also studied law in Göttingen in 1833: he lived in a tiny house on the "Wall", now known as "Bismarck Cottage". According to oral tradition, he lived there because his rowdiness had caused him to be banned from living within the city walls.

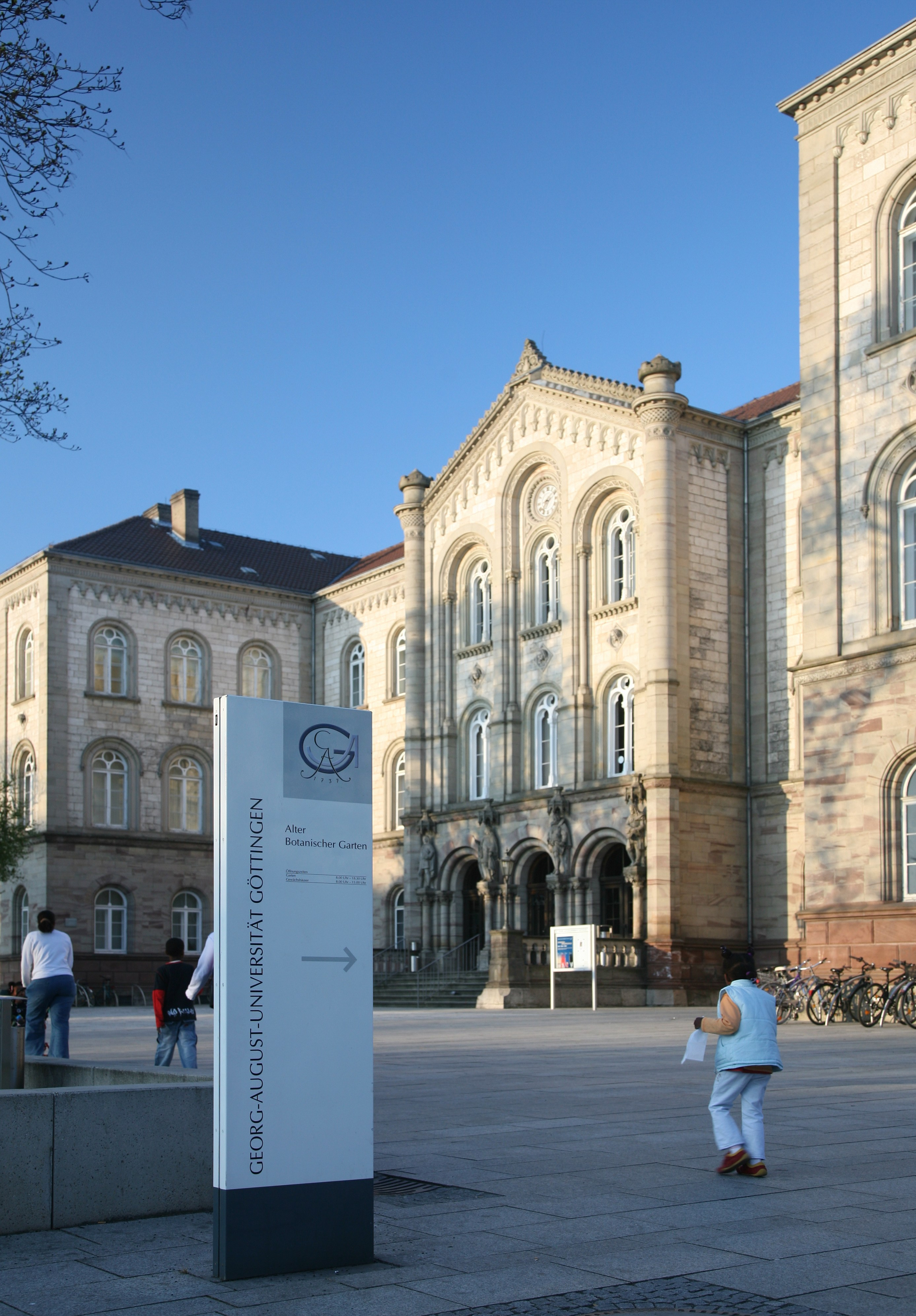
Old Auditorium, the building used often for events and as a library for Roman law

By the university's centenary in 1837, it was known as the "university of law", as the students enrolled by the faculty of law often made up more than half of the university's students. However, political disturbances, in which both professors and students were implicated, lowered the attendance to 860 in 1834. The expulsion in 1837 of the seven professors – often referred to as the Göttingen Seven (the Germanist Wilhelm Eduard Albrecht (1800–1876), the historian Friedrich Christoph Dahlmann (1785–1860), the orientalist Georg Heinrich August Ewald (1803–1875), the historian Georg Gottfried Gervinus (1805–1875), the physicist Wilhelm Eduard Weber (1804–1891), and the philologist brothers Jakob (1785–1863) and Wilhelm Grimm (1786–1859)) – for protesting against the revocation by Ernest Augustus, King of Hanover, of the liberal constitution of 1833 hurt the reputation of the city and the university.

Towards the end of the 19th century, Rudolf von Jhering, a most significant civil law scholar who created the theory of "Culpa in contrahendo" (fault in conclusion of a contract) and wrote The Battle for Rights, remained a law professor in Göttingen until he died. Lassa Francis Lawrence Oppenheim, known as the father of the modern discipline of international law and author of the famous two-volume "International Law: A Treatise", earned his doctorate in law from the University of Göttingen in 1881. Karl Larenz, a German jurist and philosopher of law known for his influential contributions to German civil law, also received his doctorate in law in Göttingen in 1926.

After the end of the World War II, famous faculty members included: Claus Roxin, one of the most influential dogmatists of German criminal law, and Christian Starck, one of Germany's leading constitutional lawyers. Prominent former faculty also included Christoph Möllers, one of Germany's leading experts on constitutional law who was awarded the Leibniz Prize. Famous academic alumni of the Faculty of Law included: Eberhard Schmidt-Aßmann, one of Germany's leading public lawyers who earned both his doctorate in law (1966) and habilitation (1971) in Göttingen.

== Current status ==
Today, a number of judges in significant national and international courts are still affiliated with the Faculty of Law. As of 2021, four out of sixteen in-office Justices of the Federal Constitutional Court (German: Bundesverfassungsgericht; abbreviated: BVerfG), Germany's supreme constitutional court, are affiliated with the University of Göttingen: two of them (Andreas Paulus & Christine Langenfeld) are, currently, professors at the Faculty of Law of the University of Göttingen, while two others (Ines Härtel & Henning Radtke) obtained their doctorate in law (Dr.iur) from the Faculty of Law at the University of Göttingen. Also in 2021, Georg Nolte, a former professor of public international law at the University of Göttingen, took office as Judge of the International Court of Justice on behalf of the Federal Republic of Germany. Additionally, Hsu Tzong-li, a Taiwanese judge who has served as the President of the Judicial Yuan since 2016, earned his doctorate in law from University of Göttingen in 1986.

== Student journal ==
There is one student journal in the field of international law which is published online in English – Goettingen Journal of International Law.
