= Legal Positivism (book) =

1979 book by Norberto Bobbio

- Author: Norberto Bobbio
- Original title: Il Positivismo Giuridico
- Language: Italian
- Genre: Non-fiction
- Publication date: 1979
- ISBN: 8834861671

Legal Positivism (Il Positivismo Giuridico) is a book by the Italian jurist Norberto Bobbio about one of the ontological elements of foundations of law — the jusphilosophical school called juspositivism or legal positivism.

== Importance ==
Seen by scholars as an important work in understanding of a conceptual constructivist approach of the scientific way of thinking law in the new era of the jurisprudence of values, Bobbio's book faces this challenge in eleven chapters.

== Chapters ==
=== Part I ===
Introduction: natural law and positive law in thinking along the history

1. Historical predecessors, relation between natural and positive law, the history context of the legal positivism, common law and civil law
2. The historical law school as predecessor; Thibaut versus Savigny about the codification of law in Germany
3. The Napoleonic Code in France; the exegesis school; Portalis
4. The origins of legal positivism in Germany; Bentham and Austin; the illuminist inspiration; Jhering's method of the juridical science

=== Part 2 ===
Introduction: the main points of the juspositivism doctrine

1. Positivism as non-value judgments; legal realism and legal positivism; formalism and legal positivism
2. Definition of law as enforcement; Thomasius; Kant; Jhering; Ross
3. Sources of law; judicial decisions as sources of law; equity; nature of things (Natur der Sache); uses and habits
4. Imperative theory; Austin; Thon
5. The theory of legal order
6. The interpretation function of jurisprudence; integration and analogy
7. Positivism as ideology; legal order as value of law

== Criticism ==
"The legal positivism considers only what is put by the State. Its basic thesis is that the law is product of human action and desire and no more of the divine natural or rational as affirmed formerly by the jusnaturalism. Various authors also defend that there isn't necessarily a relation between law, moral and justice, because notions of justice and moral are time and space dependent and without political power to support them and impose them against who creates the juridical norms"

"Legal Positivism of Norberto Bobbio, shows us the final and most advanced reading of the legal positivism

"Bobbio, about the first jusphilosophers of legal positivism, rhapsodizing a metaphor attributed to Newton, described himself as a dwarf on the shoulder of a giant, in the sense that 'If we are on the shoulder of a giant, we can see more than even the giants themselves, but if there weren't the giants, we couldn't achieve that height'".

== Bibliography ==
- Bobbio, Norberto. Il Positivismo Giuridico, 3rd edition. Torino: G. Giapichelli, 1996, ISBN 8834861671

== See also ==
- Jurisprudence of values
- Natural law
- Juridical system
- Rule of law
