= Free scientific research =

School of thought in legal philosophy

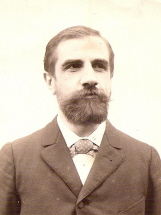
François Gény, the main jusphilosopher of the free scientific research

In philosophy of law, free scientific research is a precursor of the jurisprudence of values. Free scientific research asserts that, in order to discover the origins of law's principles and rules, the interpreter's studies may have support on various "sciences" such as sociology, economics, linguistics, philosophy and theology, that previous law teachers had not used before.

Its main proponent was François Gény, others like include Stamler and Eugen Ehrlich. This school of thought is also referred as the French school of interpretation and inherits aspects from Greek philosophy.

== Concepts ==
The free scientific school of thought intended to solve the contradictions of the exegesis school and improve the traditional juspositivism. One of its goals was to complete the "voids" of legal order fulfilling them with scientific elements, so denying law as the unique source of that order.

This paradigm emphasizes the use of equity as source of the law. The free scientific school has elements which have come from the philosophical school called the nature of things.

== Distinction ==
The free scientific school may not be identified to the natural law, they are different concepts. There can also be confusion between free scientific with free law. These two schools are not identical one to the other.

== Bibliography ==
- Motte, Olivier J. (2001). "Gény, François". In Michael Stolleis (ed.). Juristen: ein biographisches Lexikon; von der Antike bis zum 20. Jahrhundert (in German) (2nd ed.). München: Beck. p. 236. ISBN 3406459579.

== See also ==
- Jurisprudence of concepts
- Jurisprudence of interests
- Philosophy of law
- Legal positivism
- Legal naturalism
- Hermeneutics
