= João Maurício Adeodato =

Brazilian jurist and legal philosopher (1956–2026)

João Maurício Leitão Adeodato (March 12, 1956 – May 19, 2026) was a Brazilian jurist and legal philosopher.

In higher education in Brazil, Adeodato made significant contributions to the consolidation of postgraduate studies in Law, serving as a researcher at various universities and as a consultant for official and private institutions. In the philosophical realm, Adeodato conducted the first critical analysis of Hannah Arendt's work in Brazil during the 1980s and became a pioneer in the development of Rhetorical Theory of Law. In recognition of his international career, Adeodato became the first Brazilian to serve on the executive committee of the World Congress of the International Association for Philosophy of Law and Social Philosophy (IVR in the German abbreviation).

== Life and career ==
João Maurício Adeodato was born in Belo Horizonte (Minas Gerais) and moved to Pernambuco during his childhood. He completed his Bachelor of Laws degree at the Law School of Recife (Federal University of Pernambuco). In 1978, he began his career as a lawyer. The following year, he enrolled in the master's program in law at the University of São Paulo, under the guidance of Miguel Reale, and conducted extensive research on "The philosophy of law of Nicolai Hartmann".

In 1981, Adeodato began his doctoral studies in law at the University of São Paulo, guided by Tércio Sampaio Ferraz Jr. During this period, he investigated the philosophy of Hannah Arendt, producing the first critical academic monograph on this subject shortly after the publication of a descriptive book on Arendt by Celso Lafer. He completed his doctorate in 1986.

Before finishing his doctorate Adeodato was appointed an assistant professor at the Law School of Federal University of Pernambuco, becoming a full professor at this institution in 1990, both through public examinations. Since the late 1980s, he taught Philosophy of Law in postgraduate programs at various Brazilian institutions, making significant contributions to the development of postgraduate education in this field.

In 1984, he became a researcher for National Council for Scientific and Technological Development and established the first and longest-standing research group in law studies in Brazil. Beginning in 1988, Adeodato undertook a series of postdoctoral studies at German universities. His early postdoctoral work was at the University of Mainz (1988–1989), where he engaged with rhetorical philosophers aligned with Theodor Viehweg's thought. He also completed postdoctoral studies at the University of Freiburg (1995), Heidelberg (2000, 2003, 2009, 2011), Hagen (2014–2015), Frankfurt (2018–2019) and Kiel (2023–2024). Additionally, he provided academic and legal consultancy for the development, accreditation, and enhancement of numerous public and private undergraduate and postgraduate law programs in Brazil, serving as both a reviewer and legal consultant.

In 2011 he passed the examination for the title of senior lecturer (Livre-docente) in philosophy of law at the University of São Paulo, with his thesis titled "A Theory of Legal Norms and Subjective Rights in a Rhetorical Philosophy of Legal Dogmatics".

Adeodato served as a visiting professor at numerous international institutions, including the Universities of Göttingen (1991, 2000, 2015, and 2019), Freiburg im Breisgau (1995), Frankfurt am Main (1995, 2011, and 2015), Duquesne University in Pittsburgh (1999), Coimbra (2000), Pablo de Olavide in Seville (2000), Augsburg (2000), Kiel (2000, 2018, 2023, and 2024), Lecce (2004), the National University of Comahue in Bariloche (2006 and 2013), Patras, Greece (2006), Los Andes and Catholic University in Chile (2008), Bielefeld (2009), Buenos Aires (2011), Lisbon (2012, 2014), Minho (2014), Salzburg (2012, 2014, 2015, and 2019), and the Instituto Tecnológico Autónomo de México (2012). After retiring from the Federal University of Pernambuco, he continued his teaching and academic roles at other institutions. He was a Permanent Professor at the Law School of Vitória and at the Nove de Julho University, as well as a Collaborating Professor at the São Paulo School of Law (EPD) and in the LL.M. program in Legal Theory at the University of Frankfurt.

Adeodato died on May 19, 2026, at the age of 70.

== Adeodato's thought ==
=== Legal thought: realist rhetoric of law ===
Adeodato's realist rhetoric stands in opposition to dominant theses in contemporary Western culture regarding rhetoric and law. He revisits discussions from the sophists, Aristotle, and later thinkers such as the Hellenistic skeptic philosopher Sextus Empiricus, whose works are often titled "Against" (adversus). Inspired by this philosopher, he labels his main theses "Against Ontological Philosophers", "Against Aristotelian Rhetoricians" and "Against Ontological Philosophers and Aristotelian Rhetoricians".

He argued that reality is created, constituted, and shaped by the prevailing narrative, which he refers to as material rhetoric. This is not merely consensus or an ontological essence; it is human language, controlled intersubjectively within the very fabric of language itself. All human thought and perception occur in and through language. Nothing escapes rhetoric. Empirical data are not objective, but this does not imply that reality is subjective, at least not in the sense of being dependent on each individual; rather, they are intersubjective, which leads to the concept of public control over language. Consequently, Adeodato also critiques "decisionism" and other forms of authoritarian imposition of legal decisions.

This view of rhetoric is also inspired by Friedrich Nietzsche, Theodor Viehweg, Ottmar Ballweg, and Katharina von Schlieffen (Sobota). Despite these influences, Adeodato also developed original arguments.

=== Political thought: radical democracy ===
In 2016, during the controversy surrounding the impeachment process against President Dilma Rousseff, Adeodato expressed his views in an interview with the Diário de Pernambuco newspaper. Although he opposed the impeachment on the grounds that its consequences would not be favorable for the country (pragmatism), he argued that the procedure was carried out by the competent authorities and followed due process. Therefore, he asserted that it cannot be referred to as a "coup," trivializing the concept.

Adeodato also advocated for the dispersal of power and identified himself as a "radical democrat." In that same interview, he described himself as a parliamentary and left-wing democrat, criticizing professional politicians and existing parties.

== Legal works ==
With over 200 published works in Brazil and abroad (Germany, Argentina, China, Spain, the United States, France, the Netherlands, India, Italy, Portugal, and Turkey) in the fields of rhetoric and legal philosophy, Adeodato is recognized as one of Brazil's leading legal philosophers. Among his major works are:

- Introduction to the Study of Law: Realist Rhetoric, Argumentation, and Eristics (Introdução ao Estudo do Direito: Retórica Realista, Argumentação e Erística. Rio de Janeiro: Forense, 2023).
- Philosophy of Law: A Critique of Truth in Ethics and Science (Filosofia do Direito: uma crítica à verdade na ética e na ciência. 6. ed. São Paulo: Saraiva, 2019, 1th ed. 1997.)
- The Problem of Legitimacy: On the steps of Hannah Arendt's Thought (O problema da legitimidade: no rastro do pensamento de Hannah Arendt. 2. ed. Belo Horizonte: D'Plácido, 2016.)
- A Rhetorical Theory of Legal Norms and Subjective Rights (Uma teoria retórica da norma jurídica e do direito subjetivo. 2. ed. Sao Paulo: Noeses, 2014.)
- Ethics and Rhetoric: Towards a Theory of Legal Dogmatics (Ética e retórica: para uma teoria da dogmática jurídica. 4. ed. São Paulo: Saraiva, 2009.)
- Constitutional Rhetoric: On Tolerance, Human Rights, and Other Ethical Foundations of Positive Law. (A retórica constitucional: sobre tolerância, direitos humanos e outros fundamentos éticos do direito positivo. São Paulo: Saraiva, 2009.)
