= A Theory of Legal Order =

1960 book by Norberto Bobbio

A Theory of Legal Order (Teoria dell'Ordinamento Giuridico) is a book of the Italian jurist Norberto Bobbio about one of the ontological elements of foundations of law — the juridical order.

== Importance ==
Seen by scholars as an important work in understanding of a conceptual constructivist approach of the scientific way of thinking law in the new era of the jurisprudence of values, Bobbio's book faces this challenge in five chapters.

== Chapters ==
1. Concept of law; going from the juridical norm to the juridical order.
2. Unity of legal order;sources of law; the grundnorm; law and force.
3. Cohesiveness of the legal order; solution of conflicts between norms.
4. Completeness of legal order; the problem of gaps of law; analogy.
5. Relationships between different legal orders, in different countries or in the same country in different times; different legal orders in the same State.

== Criticism ==
"It's in the first chapter of the book, which could be a possible introduction, that the renowned jusphilosopher opted for not making. It is the connexion of this book, that study the complex of norms, with his former work, A Theory of Judicial Norms, that analyzed isolatedly the norm; and then both constitute his integer general theory of law."

"A Theory of Legal Order is an attempt to solve some problems that the theory of the norm hadn't managed to solve or even had answer unsatisfatorily, as, for instance, the questions of the completeness and conflicts between norms. Bobbio declares expressly that his work can be considered a continuation or complement of Kelsen's work, specially his General Theory of Law and State."

"In this work, the italian thinker analyzes no more the norm isolatedly, but the relationship between them inside an order. The author emphasizes the formal aspects of the unity, the cohesiveness and completess of law as a closed logical system, with the clear intention to survey the law with the objective criteria, sine qua non to rise them to a scientific level, through the juridical speech."

== Bibliography ==
- Bobbio, Norberto.Teoria dell'ordinamento Giuridico. Torino:G. Giapichelli, 1960, ISBN 8834801857

== See also ==
- jurisprudence of values
- natural law
- juridical system
- rule of law
