= Historism =

19th-century philosophy originating in Germany

Historism (German: Historismus) is a philosophical and historiographical theory, founded in 19th-century Germany and especially influential in 19th- and 20th-century Europe. In those times there was not a single natural, humanistic or philosophical science that would not reflect, in one way or another, the historical type of thought (cf. comparative historical linguistics etc.). It pronounces the historicity of humanity and its binding to tradition.

Historist historiography rejects historical teleology and bases its explanations of historical phenomena on sympathy and understanding for the events, acting persons, and historical periods. The historist approach takes to its extreme limits the common observation that human institutions (language, Art, religion, law, State) are subject to perpetual change.

== Core Principles and Concepts ==
This approach argues that human reality is entirely historical, and that human beings can only be properly understood as historical entities.

Particularity (Uniqueness): According to historism, historical events are unique and cannot be repeated like natural phenomena, nor can they be explained through general laws. Each period should be understood within its own values and conditions. As Leopold von Ranke famously stated, history should be described “as it actually happened” (wie es eigentlich gewesen).

The Method of Understanding (Verstehen): In contrast to the method of “explanation” (Erklären) used in the natural sciences, this approach emphasizes “understanding” (Verstehen) as the main method of history and the human sciences. The historian must enter into the spirit of a past period and reconstruct it mentally in order to understand it.

The Historicity of Human Life: According to this view, human nature is not fixed. All cultural forms—such as philosophy, law, religion, and art—are products of historical development and tradition. Everything that is human is shaped by history.

== Notable exponents ==
Notable exponents of historism were primarily the German 19th-century historians Leopold von Ranke and Johann Gustav Droysen, 20th-century historian Friedrich Meinecke, and the philosopher Wilhelm Dilthey. Dilthey was influenced by Ranke. The jurists Friedrich Carl von Savigny and Karl Friedrich Eichhorn were strongly influenced by the ideas of historism and founded the German Historical School of Law. The Italian philosopher, anti-fascist and historian Benedetto Croce and his British colleague Robin George Collingwood were important European exponents of historism in the late 19th and early 20th century. Collingwood was influenced by Dilthey.

Ranke's arguments can be viewed as an antidote to the lawlike and quantitative approaches common in sociology and most other social sciences.

The principle of historism has a universal methodological significance in Marxism. The essence of this principle, in brief, is:

not to forget the underlying historical connection, to examine every question from the standpoint of how the given phenomenon arose in history and what principal stages this phenomenon passed through in its development, and, from the standpoint of its development, to examine what the given thing has become today.

— Vladimir Lenin, The State: A Lecture Delivered at the Sverdlov University

== Contemporary thought ==
20th-century German historians promoting some aspects of historism are Ulrich Muhlack, Thomas Nipperdey and Jörn Rüsen.

The Spanish philosopher José Ortega y Gasset was influenced by historism.

== Criticism ==
Because of the power held on the social sciences by logical positivism, historism or historicism is deemed unpopular.

Georg G. Iggers is one of the most important critical authors on historism. His book The German Conception of History: The National Tradition of Historical Thought from Herder to the Present, first published in 1968 is a "classic" among critiques of historism.

Another critique is presented by the German philosopher Friedrich Nietzsche, whose 1874 essay "On the Use and Abuse of History for Life" denounces "a malignant historical fever". Nietzsche contends that the historians of his times, the historists, damaged the powers of human life by relegating it to the past instead of opening it to the future. For this reason, he calls for a return, beyond historism, to humanism.

Karl Popper was one of the most distinguished critics of historicism. He differentiated between both phenomena as follows: The term historicism is used in his influential books The Poverty of Historicism and The Open Society and Its Enemies to describe “an approach to the social sciences which assumes that historical prediction is their primary aim, and which assumes that this aim is attainable by discovering the 'rhythms' or the 'patterns', the 'laws' or the 'trends' that underlie the evolution of history”. Popper wrote with reference to Hegel's theory of history, which he criticized extensively. By historism on the contrary, he means the tendency to regard every argument or idea as completely accounted for by its historical context, as opposed to assessing it by its merits. Historism does not aim for the 'laws' of history, but premises the individuality of each historical situation.

On the basis of Popper's definitions, the historian Stefan Berger proposes as a proper word usage:

I deliberately use the term ‘historism’ (and ‘historist’) rather than ‘historicism’ (and ‘historicist’). Whereas ‘historism’ (in German: Historismus), as represented by Leopold von Ranke, can be seen as an evolutionary, reformist concept which understands all political order as historically developed and grown, ‘historicism’ (Historizismus), as defined and rejected by Karl Popper, is based on the notion that history develops according to predetermined laws towards a particular end. The English language, by using only one term for those different concepts, tends to conflate the two. Hence I suggest using two separate terms in analogy to the German language.

== See also ==
- Heinrich Rickert
- Historical school of economics
