= The Philosophical Manifesto of the Historical School of Law =

"The Philosophical Manifesto of the Historical School of Law" (German: "Philosophische Manifest der historischen Rechtsschule") is a manuscript written by German political philosopher Karl Marx in 1842. It was first published in the Supplement to the Rheinische Zeitung No. 221, August 9, 1842. The chapter about marriage was cut by the censor in the original publication. The complete article was first published in MECW 1927.

== Content ==
The manuscript explores the origin of the German Historical School that started from Gustav Hugo. The paper argues that the school emerged from the spirit of Enlightenment of the 18th century, rather than being against it, and analyzes that the school emerged from a misinterpretation of Kantian philosophy, which leads to a failure to differentiate the rational and irrational. He also points the circular reasoning and the appeal to authority as a key feature of the historical school. Also he criticizes that the fact that the school's presumption of the universality of human nature does not reflect the realities of each country and rather it makes the theory more conservative than its original source Kant arguing objectionable practices are no longer differentiable from already accepted laws.
