= Historical school (disambiguation) =

Historical school are movements in the study of the methods used by historians.

It may also refer to:

- Historical school of political economy, a movement in late political economy
- German Historical School, a movement in jurisprudence
