= Left and right =

Left and right or left–right may refer to:

- Left and right directions, body relative directions in terms of an observer
- Left and right as designating different chiralities, independent of an observer (as in left glove, left-eyed flatfish, left-handed screw threads)
- Left- and right-handedness
- Left- and right-laterality
- Left- and right-ocular dominance
- Left–right political spectrum

Left and right or Left Right may also refer to:

== Mathematics ==
- Left and right (algebra)
- Orientation (geometry)
- One-sided limits in calculus and other derived meanings

== Arts ==
- Left & Right (album), a 1968 album by Rahsaan Roland Kirk
- "Left & Right" (D'Angelo song), 2000
- "Left & Right" (Seventeen song), 2020
- "Left and Right" (Charlie Puth song), 2022, featuring Jung Kook
- "Left, Right", YG song, 2013
- "Left Right" (XG song), 2023
- "Left, Right", by The Chemical Brothers from Push the Button, 2005
- "Left, Right", by Inna from Hot, 2009
- "Left, Right", by Lil Tecca from We Love You Tecca, 2019
- Left and Right: A Journal of Libertarian Thought, a 1965 libertarian journal
- In Love We Trust, also known as Left Right, a Chinese film
- Left/Right, an American TV production company controlled by Red Arrow Entertainment Group

== Literature ==
- Left and Right: The Significance of a Political Distinction, a 1994 book by Norberto Bobbio

== See also ==
- Sinistral and dextral, the two types of chirality ("handedness") or relative direction in some scientific fields
- Dexter and sinister, the Latin names of left and right, used in science and heraldry
- Left Right and Centre, a comedy film
- Left Right Left (disambiguation)
