= Geny =

Geny may refer to:

- GenY, or Generation Y, demographic cohort following Generation X
- Francois Geny (1861–1959), French jurist
