= Philipp Heck =

German jurist

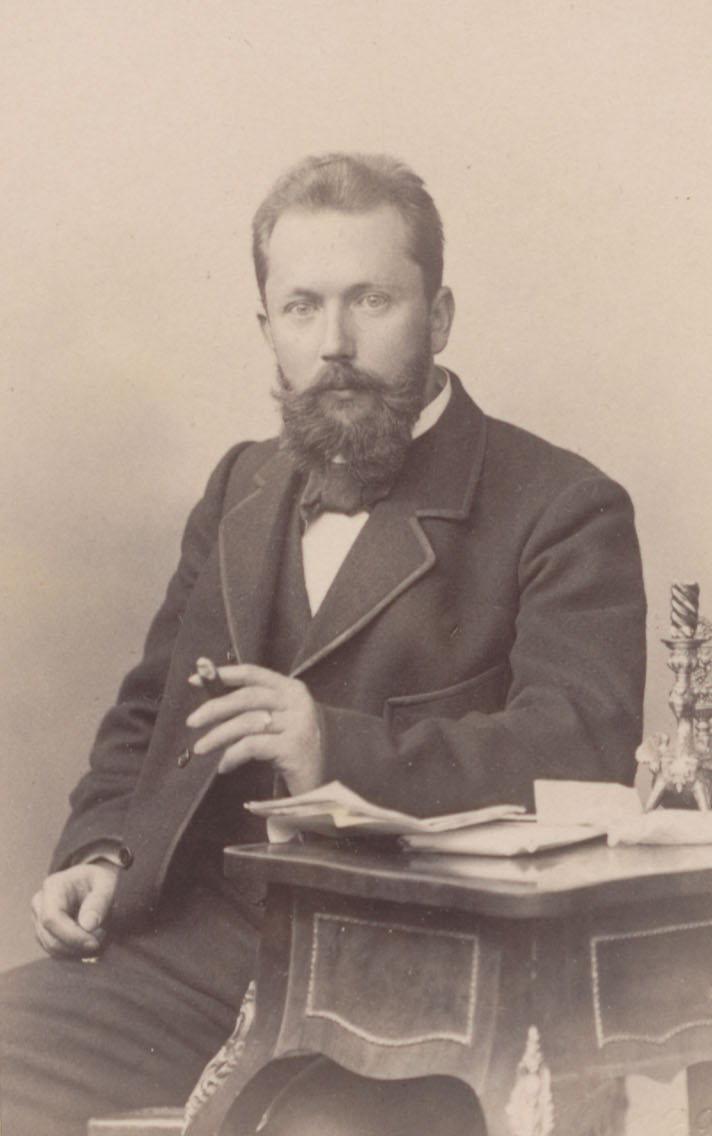
- Born: 22 July 1858; Saint Petersburg, Russian Empire
- Died: 28 June 1943 (aged 84); Tübingen, Nazi Germany

Philipp Heck (22 July 1858 – 28 June 1943) was a German jurist and a leading proponent of the doctrine of jurisprudence of interests.

After studies in Berlin, he taught law since 1891 at the University of Greifswald, since 1892 at the University of Halle and from 1901 until 1928 at the University of Tübingen. His work on judicial methodology was highly influential in helping to establish the doctrine of jurisprudence of interests, which he often polemically defended against the opposing schools of free law (Freirechtslehre) and the jurisprudence of concepts. Under National Socialist rule, Heck attempted to gain favor with the regime by using his methodology to justify the application of Nazi racial legislation.
