= Kate Soper =

British philosopher (born 1943)

- Born: 1943 (age 82–83)
- Education: University of Oxford (BA); Sussex University (MA and PhD study)
- Occupation: Philosopher

Kate Soper (born 1943) is a British philosopher. She is Emeritus Professor of philosophy at Humanities Arts and Languages (HAL) of London Metropolitan University.

== Background ==
Soper was educated at the University of Oxford (BA) and worked as a translator and journalist. She was a postgraduate student at Sussex University and her PhD study was published as a book, On Human Needs: open and closed theories in a Marxist perspective in 1981. She subsequently taught at Sussex University, before moving in 1987 to the University of North London (which became part of London Metropolitan University in 2002). She taught a range of undergraduate and postgraduate courses in European Studies and Literature and Modernity. She retired c.2009, becoming Emeritus Professor of philosophy at Humanities Arts and Languages (HAL) and was also a part-time researcher at the former Institute for the Study of European Transformations (ISET), both at London Metropolitan University. She was also a Visiting Professor at the University of Brighton. She was elected a fellow of the Royal Society of Arts in 2008–2009.

== Contributions ==
Soper is the author of and contributor to over a dozen books on feminism and Continental Philosophy, addressing the works of Jean-Paul Sartre, Karl Marx and Simone de Beauvoir, among others. Her other contributions have been to consumption theory and environmental philosophy. She is a critic of post-structuralist feminism.

She has also translated several texts into English, including includes Chiodi's Sartre And Marxism, Sebastiano Timpanaro's The Freudian Slip, Bobbio's Liberalism and Democracy (with Martin Ryle), and (with Martin Ryle) Ginzburg's Wooden Eyes.

She has been involved in several environmentalist and peace movements in both the United Kingdom and the rest of Europe and her writing addresses radical ecological issues. Her contributions have appeared in the journals Radical Philosophy, New Left Review and Capitalism, Nature, Socialism. In 1998, Soper interviewed Noam Chomsky. Her study of the role that new thinking about pleasure and the "good life" can play in promoting sustainable consumption (Alternative hedonism and the theory and politics of consumption) was funded in the ESRC/AHRC "Cultures of Consumption" Programme in the mid-2000s. Since then she has been involved in a number of research projects on environmental issues and sustainable consumption including as a Visiting Fellow in 2013 at the Pufendorf Institute, Lund University, Sweden.

Her other work includes radio and television appearances (Dinner with Portillo, Channel Five, December 2005: Radio 3, Nightwaves, April 2004), and contributions to art exhibition catalogues.

For more information and a fuller bibliography of Kate Soper see Realism, humanism and alternative hedonism: an interview with Kate Soper, Part 1 and Part 2 by Jamie Morgan in The Journal of Critical Realism, July 2026.

== Selected works ==
- Soper K. 2020. Post-Growth Living: For an Alternative Hedonism. Verso.
- Soper K., L. Thomas and M. Ryle (eds.). 2009. The Politics and Pleasures of Consuming Differently. Palgrave.
- Soper K. and F Trentmann (eds.). 2008. Citizenship and Consumption. Palgrave.
- Soper K., and M. Ryle. 2001. To Relish the Sublime: Culture and Self-realisation in Postmodern Times. Verso.
- Soper K. 1995. What Is Nature?: Culture, Politics and the Non-Human. Blackwell.
- Soper K. 1990. Troubled Pleasures: Writings on Politics, Gender and Hedonism. Verso.
- Soper K. 1986. Humanism and Anti-Humanism (Problems of Modern European Thought). Hutchinson.
- Soper K. 1981. On Human Needs. Harvester.
