= Goettingen Journal of International Law =

- Discipline: Law review
- Language: English

Publication details
- History: 2007 -
- Publisher: Universitätsverlag Göttingen (Germany)
- Frequency: semi-annual
- Open access: yes

Standard abbreviations
- ISO 4: Goettingen J. Int. Law

Indexing
- ISSN: 1868-1581

Links
- Journal homepage

The Goettingen Journal of International Law (GoJIL) is a jurisprudential online journal published by a student group in the Faculty of Law at the University of Göttingen in cooperation with the Institute of International and European Law in Göttingen.

== Overview ==
The Goettingen Journal of International Law focuses primarily on international law. It also encompasses a wide variety of related topics like international economic law, international penal law, and international relations.

All issues are available to be read free of charge in open access standard on the website of GoJIL. The journal is published semi-annually and completely in English. Contributions by professors, early-career academics, and advanced students are considered for publication through a peer review process.

== History ==
Founded by students in 2007, the journal is oriented towards the model of American law reviews. Advanced students conduct all editorial procedures.

The Scientific Advisory Board, composed of advanced PhD candidates and postdoctoral candidates, ensures the highest degree of scholarly standards. The Advisory Board, which includes professors and practitioners (Thomas Buergenthal (ICJ), Angelika Nussberger (ECtHR) Bruno Simma (ICJ), Georg Nolte, Peter-Tobias Stoll, Kai Ambos, Christian Calliess, Andreas Paulus (BVerfG), Dietrich Rauschning, Walter Reese-Schäfer, Frank Schorkopf, Anja Seibert-Fohr), supports the student-editors.
