= Georg Friedrich Puchta =

German jurist (1798–1846)

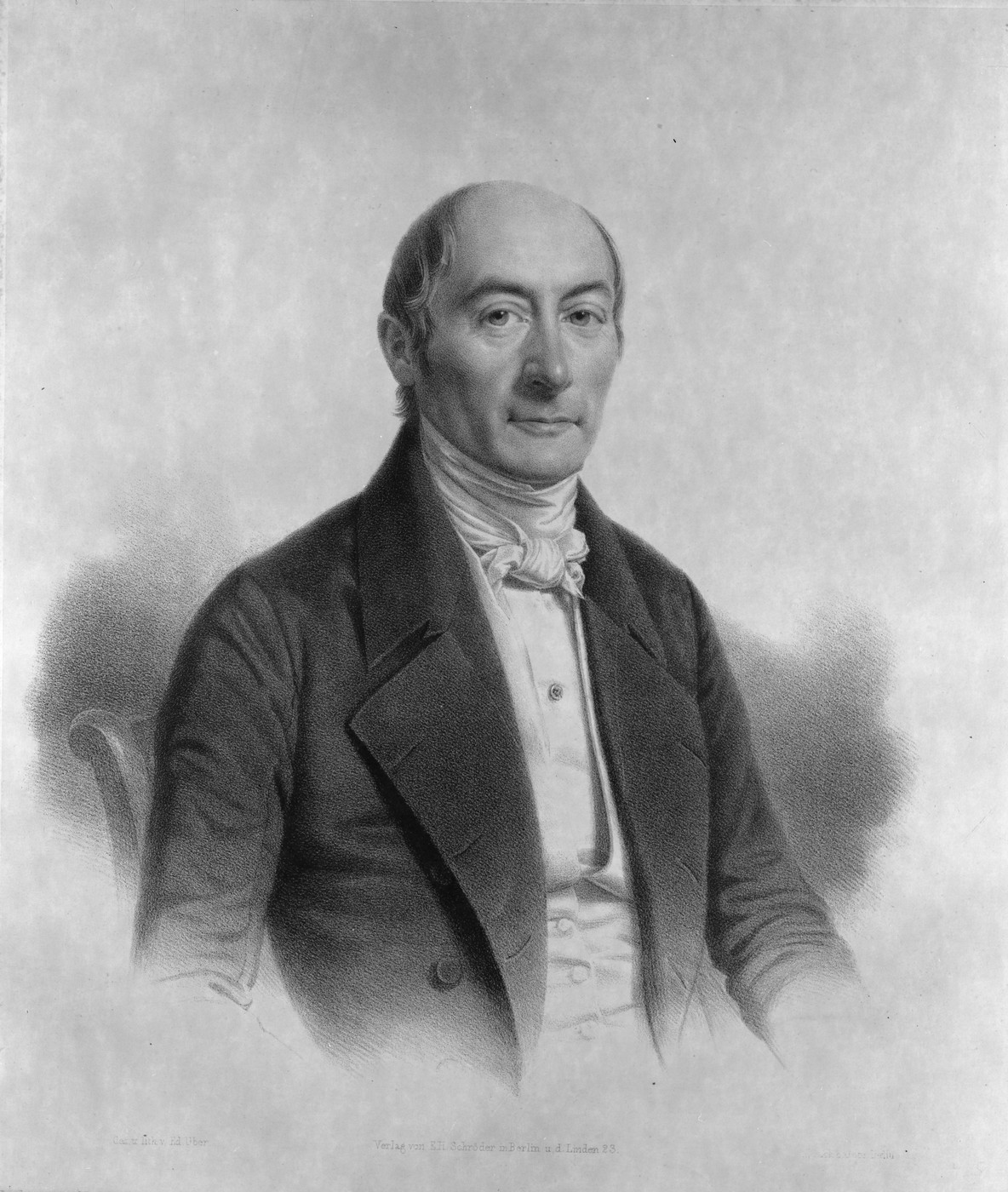
- Georg Friedrich Puchta by E. Uber (Drawer and lithographer)
- Born: 31 August 1798; Kadolzburg, Electorate of Bavaria, Holy Roman Empire
- Died: 8 January 1846 (aged 47); Berlin, Province of Brandenburg, Kingdom of Prussia
- Occupation: Legal scholar
- Parent: Wolfgang Heinrich Puchta (father)

Georg Friedrich Puchta (31 August 1798 – 8 January 1846) was a German Legal scholar.

== Biography ==
Born on 31 August 1798 at Kadolzburg in Bavaria, Puchta came of an old Bohemian Protestant family which had immigrated into Germany to avoid religious persecution. His father, Wolfgang Heinrich Puchta (1769–1845), a legal writer and district judge, imbued his son with legal conceptions and principles. From 1811 to 1816 Puchta attended the Egidiengymnasium at Nuremberg, during the headmastership of Georg Wilhelm Friedrich Hegel, an eminent German philosopher.

In 1816 Puchta began his legal studies at the University of Erlangen, where—in addition to being initiated by his father into legal practice—he fell under the influence of the writings of Savigny and Niebuhr. At this time the famous Christian Friedrich von Glück lectured there. Puchta said about the faculty of Erlangen: "Jede Universität ist freilich mit einem Pfahl im Fleisch geplagt, aber die hiesige Fakultät hat, wenn Glück stirbt, nichts als Pfähle". (Translation "Every university certainly is plagued with a thorn in the flesh, but the faculty here, when Glück dies, will have nothing but thorns.") Taking his doctorate (Dissertatio de Itinere, Actu et Via) and his habilitation in Roman Law at Erlangen, he established himself there in 1820 as a Privatdozent.

In 1821 Puchta went on a year-long trip (peregrinatio academica) around Germany to visit important universities. During this trip he met some of the foremost German legal scholars of his time: Gustav Hugo, Friedrich Carl von Savigny und Anton Friedrich Justus Thibaut.

One year later, Puchta was appointed Professor at University of Erlangen (außerordentlicher Professor für Rechtswissenschaft), where he stated on until 1828.

Leaving Erlangen, Puchta was appointed full Professor of Roman Law at Ludwig-Maximilians-Universität München (LMU Munich) in 1828. He stayed in Munich until he moved to the University of Marburg in 1835 to become a professor of Roman and Ecclesiastical Law (ordentlicher Professor für römisches Recht und Kirchenrecht). In 1837, he left Marburg to become a Professor for Legal Scholarship at Leipzig University (ordentlicher Professor für Rechtswissenschaft).

When Friedrich Carl von Savigny was appointed Minister of Justice of Prussia (Minister für Revision der Gesetzgebung) on 28 February 1842, there was some debate concerning his succession at Berlin University (then named Friedrich-Wilhelms-Universität). Finally Puchta was chosen to succeed him in 1842.

At the pinnacle of this legal career, Puchta was in 1842 appointed to the Prussian Supreme Tribunal (Preußisches Obertribunal). In 1845, he became a member of the consultative Prussian Council of State (Preußischer Staatsrat) and the Prussian Legislative Commission (Gesetzgebungskommission).

Puchta died suddenly in Berlin on 8 January 1846 due to Miserere.

== Legal thinking ==
His chief merit as a jurist lay in breaking with past unscientific methods in the teaching of Roman law and in making its spirit intelligible to students.

Among his writings must be especially mentioned Lehrbuch der Pandekten (Leipzig, 1838, and many later editions), in which he elucidated the dogmatic essence of Roman law in a manner never before attempted; and the Kursus der Institutionen (Leipzig, 1841–1847, and later editions), which gives a clear picture of the organic development of law among the Romans. Among his other writings are Das Gewohnheitsrecht (Erlangen, 1828–1837) and Einleitung in das Recht der Kirche (Leipzig, 1840).

Kleine civilistische Schriften (1851), edited by Adolph August Friedrich Rudorff, is a collection of essays on various branches of Roman law, and the preface contains a sympathetic biographical sketch of the jurist.

== Published works ==
- Puchta, Georg Friedrich (1822). Grundriß zu Vorlesungen über juristische Enzyklopädie und Methodologie (in German). C. Heyder in Comm.
- Puchta, Georg Friedrich (1829). Lehrbuch für Institutionen-Vorlesungen (in German). München: Anton Webersche Buchhandlung.
- Puchta, Georg Friedrich (1828). Das Gewohnheitsrecht (in German). Vol. I. Erlangen: Palm’sche Verlagsbuchhandlung.
- Puchta, Georg Friedrich (1837). Das Gewohnheitsrecht (in German). Vol. II. Erlangen: Palm’sche Verlagsbuchhandlung.
- Puchta, Georg Friedrich (1838). Lehrbuch der Pandekten (in German). Leipzig: Verlag von Johann Ambrosius Barth.
- Puchta, Georg Friedrich (1840). Einleitung in das Recht der Kirche (in German). Leipzig: Verlag von Breitkopf und Härtel.
- Puchta, Georg Friedrich (1841). Cursus der Institutionen: Einleitung in die Rechtswissenschaft und Geschichte des Rechts bey dem römischen Volk (in German). Vol. I. Leipzig: Verlag von Breitkopf und Härtel.
- Puchta, Georg Friedrich (1842). Cursus der Institutionen (in German). Vol. II. Leipzig: Verlag von Breitkopf und Härtel.
- Puchta, Georg Friedrich (1847). Rudorff, Adolf Friedrich August (ed.). Cursus der Institutionen (in German). Vol. III. Leipzig: Verlag von Breitkopf und Härtel. Published posthumously.
- Puchta, Georg Friedrich (1847). Vorlesungen über das heutige römische Recht (in German). Vol. I. Leipzig: Verlag von Bernhard Tauchnitz jun.
- Puchta, Georg Friedrich (1848). Rudorff, Adolf Friedrich August (ed.). Vorlesungen über das heutige römische Recht (in German). Vol. II. Leipzig: Verlag von Bernhard Tauchnitz jun. Published posthumously.
- Puchta, Georg Friedrich (1851). Rudorff, Adolf Friedrich August (ed.). Georg Friedrich Puchta's Kleine civilistische Schriften (in German). Leipzig: Verlag von Breitkopf und Härtel. Published posthumously.

== Sources ==
- Haferkamp, Hans-Peter (2004). Georg Friedrich Puchta und die "Begriffsjurisprudenz" (in German). Frankfurt am Main: Vittorio Klostermann. ISBN 978-3-465-03327-1.
- Haferkamp, Hans-Peter (8 April 2011). "Georg Friedrich Puchta". Enzyklopädie zur Rechtsphilosophie (in German). Archived from the original on 22 January 2021.
- Landau, Peter (2001). "Puchta, Georg Friedrich". Neue Deutsche Biographie (in German). Vol. 20. Berlin: Duncker & Humblot. pp. 757–759. (full text online)..
- Ziller, Tuisco (1853). Ueber die von Puchta der Darstellung des römischen Rechts zu Grunde gelegten rechtsphilosophischen Ansichten (in German). Leipzig: Druck von Alexander Edelmann.
