= Left Right Left =

Left Right Left may refer to:

- Left Right Left (TV series), an Indian television series that aired 2006–08
- Left Right Left (film), a 2013 Malayalam political drama film
- "Left, Right, Left" (Drama song), also known as "Left/Right", the lead single released from Drama's 1999 debut album, Causin' Drama
- "Left Right Left", a song by Charlie Puth from Nine Track Mind, 2016
- Left, Right, Left: Political Essays 1977–2005, by Robert Manne, 2005

== See also ==
- Left and right (disambiguation)
