= Il problema della guerra e le vie della pace =

Il problema della guerra e le vie della pace (The problems of war and the ways of peace) is a university booklet of philosopher Norberto Bobbio's lessons, first published in 1979. The lessons are famous for the three images that illustrate the conditions of humans in the era of thermonuclear weapons.

1. An open bottle with a fly flying in it;
2. The net with a fish still alive in it;
3. The maze from which a person tries to escape.

Some people behave like the fly because one day at random they will find the way out. Some behave like the trapped fish: the more they move the more they are entangled. Others behave like those lost in a maze: they try to escape using the faculties of mind.
