= Peter-Tobias Stoll =

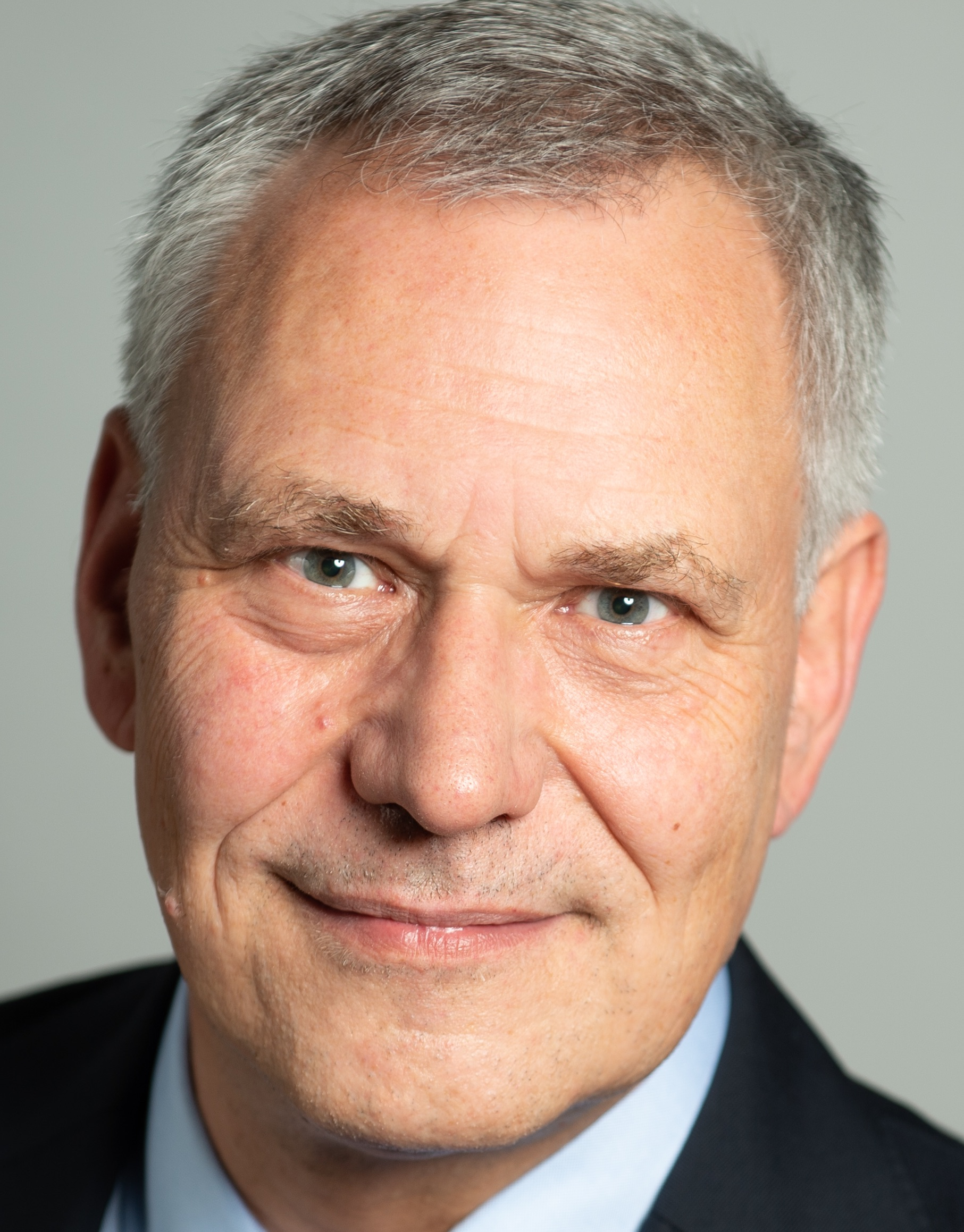
Portrait of Peter-Tobias Stoll

Peter-Tobias Stoll (born in 1959, in Wuppertal) is a German jurist. He is a professor of public law and public international law at the Georg August University of Göttingen. He has been and is a member of national bodies to oversee international cooperation in global environmental research.

After studying law at the University of Hamburg, the University of Lausanne and the University of Bonn, he passed the two state examinations for law students and worked as a research fellow at the institute of international law of the University of Kiel, where he eventually earned his Dr. iur. (PhD in Law in Germany) in 1993. Thereafter he served as a senior research fellow at the Max Planck Institute for Comparative Public Law and International Law in Heidelberg until he went through with his habilitation in 2001. Since 2001 he has held the Chair in Göttingen, where he also serves as a member of the advisory board of the Goettingen Journal of International Law.

== Works (extract) ==
- Commentaries on World Trade Law, Vol. I – VI, Martinus Nijhoff / Brill, Leiden, Boston, 2022
