= Jurisprudence of concepts =

Sub-school of legal positivism

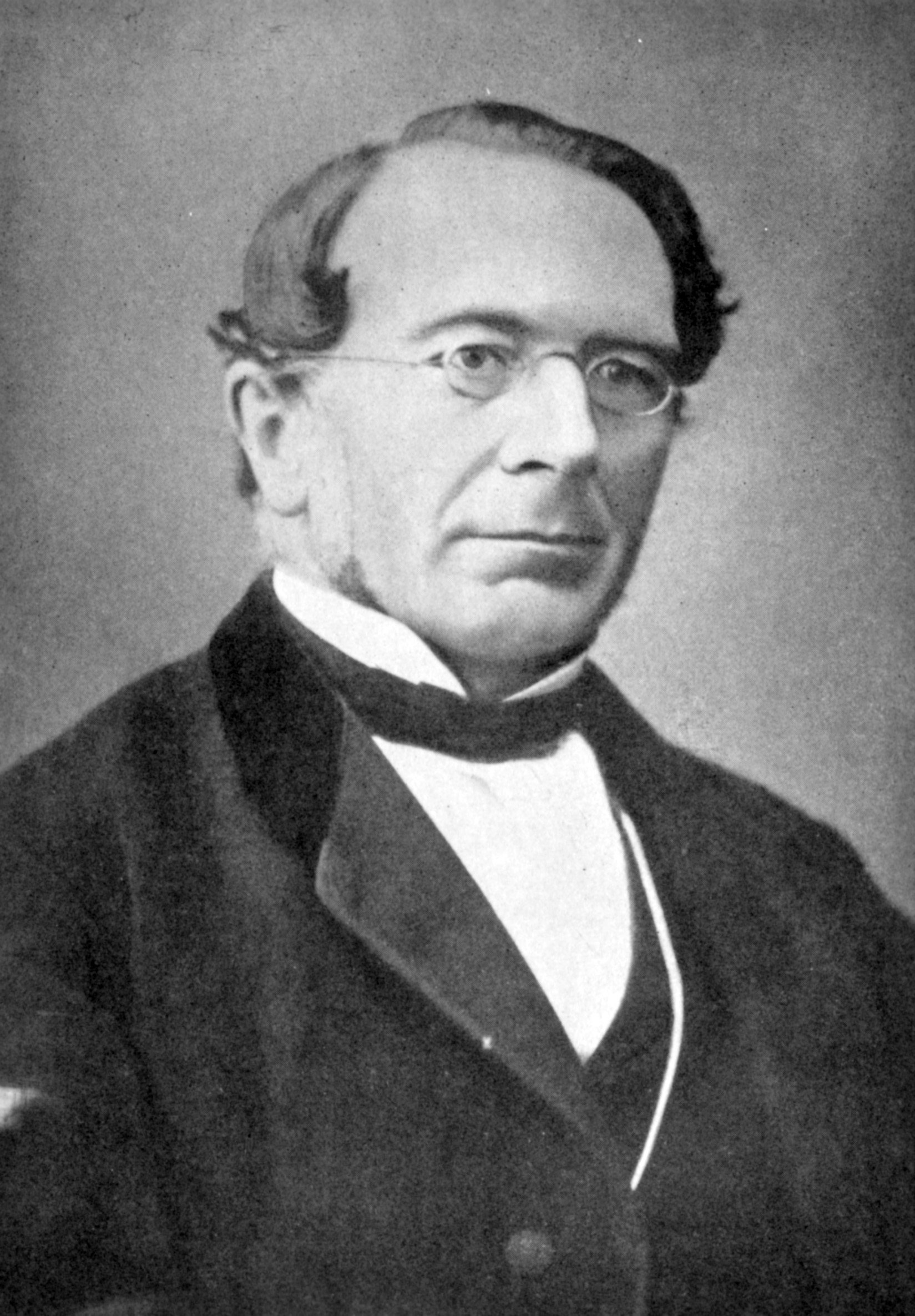
Rudolf von Ihering, one of the proponents of the jurisprudence of concepts

The jurisprudence of concepts was the first sub-school of legal positivism, according to which, the written law must reflect concepts, when interpreted. Its main representatives were Ihering, Savigny and Puchta.

This school was, thus, the preceding trigger of the idea that law comes from a dogmatic source, imposition from man over man and not a natural consequence of other sciences or of metaphysical faith.

Among the main characters of the jurisprudence of concepts are:

- formalism, search of rights in written law
- systemisation
- search for justifying specific norm with basis from more generic ones.

So, according to this school, law should have prevailing sources based upon the legislative process, although needing to be proven by more inclusive ideas of a social sense.

== See also ==
- Jurisprudence of values
- Jurisprudence of interests
- Philosophy of law
- Legal positivism
- Legal naturalism
- Hermeneutics
