= The Future of Democracy =

1984 book by Norberto Bobbio

- English edition (1987)
- Author: Norberto Bobbio
- Original title: Il futuro della democrazia
- Translator: Roger Griffin
- Language: Italian
- Subject: democracy
- Publisher: Einaudi
- Publication date: 1984
- Publication place: Italy
- English publication date: 1987
- Pages: 170
- ISBN: 8806057545

The Future of Democracy: A Defence of the Rules of the Game (Italian: Il futuro della democrazia) is a 1984 book by the Italian political scientist Norberto Bobbio. It was published in English in 1987 by the University of Minnesota Press.

== Summary ==
The book contains seven essays about the relationship between democracy and the institutions it relies on. Bobbio examined what he called the "six broken promises of democracy". These concern the respect for the individual's sovereignty, the conflict between political representation and particular interests, oligarchy, self-governance, education and transparency. Bobbio defined democracy as a set of rules and argued that even a poorly functioning democracy is preferable to a well-functioning dictatorship.

== Reception ==
Richard Dagger wrote in the Social Science Quarterly that although Bobbio represented the Italian Socialist Party in the Senate of the Republic, his conception of democracy is liberal rather than socialist, because Bobbio argued that competition between elites is the defining characteristic of democracy. Dagger wrote that the book contains "good advice" but criticised Bobbio for being too willing to accept deficiencies in democratic regimes.
