= Liberalism and Democracy =

1985 book by Norberto Bobbio

- 2006 edition
- Author: Norberto Bobbio
- Original title: Liberalismo e democrazia
- Translator: Martin Ryle and Kate Soper
- Language: Italian
- Publisher: FrancoAngeli
- Publication date: 1985
- Publication place: Italy
- English publication date: 1990
- Pages: 72

Liberalism and Democracy (Italian: Liberalismo e democrazia) is a 1985 book by the Italian political scientist Norberto Bobbio.

== Summary ==
The book is about the relationship between liberalism and democracy, covered in 17 chapters grouped in 3 parts. The first part is about the origin and constituents of liberalism, notably its central idea of individual rights, which would have been alien to the ancient world in which democracy originated. The second part is a modern history of liberal and democratic movements, including their often turbulent interactions and the recent concept of liberal democracy, which seeks to combine them. The third part is about challenges to liberal democracy, such as socialism, economic liberalism, lack of governance, populism and authoritarian forms of democracy.

== Reception ==
In Differentia: Review of Italian Thought, Edmund E. Jacobitti wrote that despite Bobbio's assurance that liberalism and democracy rarely are antagonistic, the book portrays an old conflict between individual ambitions and the demands of a society. Jacobitti wrote that the book describes the ways in which liberals and democrats have debated and that it is regrettable it does not devote more space to arguing for the necessity of dialogues and conflicts between them, asking, "what will the world's fate be if ever an evil, hypnotic, and wealthy liberal does wed the elusive demos?"
