= Thilo Marauhn =

German expert on international law (born 1963)

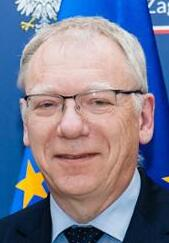
Thilo Marauhn (2024)

Thilo Marauhn (born April 30, 1963, in Lüdenscheid, West Germany) is a German expert on international law. He currently holds the professorship for Public Law and International Law at the Justus Liebig University Giessen and heads the research group “International Law” at the Leibniz Institute Hessische Stiftung Friedens- und Konfliktforschung / Peace Research Institute Frankfurt (PRIF). Apart from this, he is a researcher at the Asser Institute and recently appointed as the Special Chair Arms Control Law at the University of Amsterdam.

== Education and profession ==
After his studies of law and international relations at the University of Mannheim (1983–1985), at the University College of Wales, Aberystwyth, (Great Britain) (1985–1986), at the Rheinische Friedrich-Wilhelms-Universität Bonn (1986–1987) and at the Ruprecht Karls University of Heidelberg (1987–1990), Marauhn received his doctorate with summa cum laude in 1994 on “The legal regulation of the German renunciation of chemical weapons”. In 1995 he received a Master of Philosophy (MPhil) from the University of Wales. From 1990 to 2001 he was employed at the Max Planck Institute for Comparative Public Law and International Law in Heidelberg. In 1995, 1996, 1999 and 2000, he held teaching positions at the Johann Wolfgang Goethe University in Frankfurt am Main. In 2000, Marauhn was habilitated by this university with a thesis on “Reconstruction of fundamental social rights as a norm category”. After his first professorship at the University of Strathclyde (Glasgow) in August 2001, he was appointed to the C4 professorship for Public Law, International Law and European Law at the department of law of the Justus Liebig University (JLU). From 2006 to 2009, Marauhn was dean of the department. His research focuses on International Law, in particular Human Rights protection and International Humanitarian Law.

== Positions ==
Marauhn has been a visiting professor at various universities, including the University of Lapland (Rovaniemi, Finland), the University of Bergen (Norway), the University of Warwick (UK) and the University of Wisconsin – Madison Law School (US). Since 2001, he has held a permanent visiting professorship in Constitutional Theory at the Law Faculty of the University of Lucerne (Switzerland).

Since 1995, Marauhn has been a member of the expert committee “International Humanitarian Law” of the German Red Cross and its chairman since 2014.

In 2011, he was elected as a member of the International Humanitarian Fact-Finding Commission (IHFFC) for the term from 2012 to 2016. Marauhn was reelected in 2016. In 2015, he became First Vice-President and later he has been elected as President (2017) of the Fact-Finding Commission.

Marauhn was a member of the scientific advisory board of the Peace Research Institute Frankfurt (PRIF) from 2003 to 2013 and its chairman from 2006–2013.

Since 2005, he has been the academic director of the “International Summer University” of the Justus Liebig University in Giessen. Since 2009, Marauhn has been the co-director of the “US-German Summer School in International and Comparative Law”, currently together with professors Anuj Desai (University of Wisconsin) and Edward Fallone (Marquette University).

Marauhn was a member of the advisory board of the Development and Peace Foundation from 2009 to 2017. From 2009 to 2013, Marauhn was an elected member of the Senate of the Justus Liebig University in Giessen. He was reelected to the Senate in 2017.

From 2002 to 2009, Marauhn was a member of the scientific advisory board of the Federal Ministry for Economic Cooperation and Development, of which he was chairman from 2006 to 2009.

In 2016, he was a visiting scholar in the research group “The International Rule of Law – Rise or Decline?” in Berlin. In 2018, Marauhn was a visiting scholar at the Lauterpacht Centre for International Law and at Sidney Sussex College, University of Cambridge (UK).

From 2004 to 2006, he was a member of the scientific advisory board of the German Foundation for Peace Research. Since 2008, Marauhn has been a member of the UN political advisory board of the Federal Foreign Office.

Thilo Marauhn is a member of the Association of German Constitutional Law Professors and of the council of the German Society of International Law.

== Major works ==
EMRK/GG. Konkordanzkommentar zum europäischen und deutschen Grundrechtsschutz, ed. with O. Dörr und R. Grote, Mohr Siebeck, Tübingen 2006, 2nd edition, 2013, ISBN 978-3-16-149397-3.

The Regulation of International Financial Markets, ed. with R. Grote, Cambridge University Press, Cambridge 2006, ISBN 9780521831444.

Making Treaties Work, ed. with G. Ulfstein und A. Zimmermann, Cambridge University Press, Cambridge 2007, ISBN 9780521873178.

International Environmental Law (with U. Beyerlin), Hart Publishing, Oxford 2011, ISBN 978-3-406-62874-0.

Universality and Continuity in International Law, ed. with H. Steiger, Eleven International Publishing, Den Haag 2011, ISBN 9789490947071.

Lehre des internationalen Rechts – zeitgemäß?, Berichte der Deutschen Gesellschaft für internationales Recht, Vol. 48, Heidelberg 2017, p. 152 (with S. Hobe), ISBN 978-3-8114-4259-7.

Sicherung grund- und menschenrechtlicher Standards gegenüber neuen Gefährdungen durch private und ausländische Akteure, Veröffentlichungen der Vereinigung der Deutschen Staatsrechtslehrer 74 (2015), p. 373–400.

Kommunikationsgrundrechte, in: Dirk Ehlers (ed.), Europäische Grundrechte und Grundfreiheiten, de Gruyter, Berlin, p. 97-129 (published in 2003, 2005, 2009, 2014), ISBN 978-3-11-036315-9.

Sailing Close to the Wind: Human Rights Council Fact-Finding in Situations of Armed Conflict – The Case of Syria, California Western International Law Journal 43 (2012/2013), p. 401–459.

Menschenrecht auf eine gesunde Umwelt – Trugbild oder Wirklichkeit?, in: T. Giegerich/A. Proelß (eds.), Bewahrung des ökologischen Gleichgewichts durch Völker- und Europarecht, Duncker & Humblot, Berlin 2010, p. 11–47, ISBN 978-3-428-13293-5.

Six chapters (Eheschließungs- und Familiengründungsrecht, Recht auf Achtung des Privat- und Familienlebens, Recht auf soziale Sicherheit und Unterstützung, Rechte älterer und behinderter Menschen, Schutz der Familie, Schutz des Kindes und Jugendlicher) in: S. Heselhaus/C. Nowak (eds.), Handbuch der Europäischen Grundrechte, C.H. Beck, München 2006, ISBN 3-406-51017-5.

Social Rights Beyond the Traditional Welfare State: International Instruments and the Concept of Individual Entitlements, in: E. Benvenisti/G. Nolte (eds.), The Welfare State, Globalization, and International Law, Springer, Berlin/Heidelberg 2004, p. 275–319, ISBN 978-3-540-01103-3.

== Awards and recognition ==
- 2000: for his habilitation thesis, the 1999 Werner Pünder Prize for the best scholarly work on the topics “Freedom and Totalitarianism/Constitutional Law and the history of political ideas since the 19th century” at the Johann Wolfgang Goethe University
- 2003: Wolfgang Mittermaier Prize awarded by JLU Giessen for outstanding achievements in academic teaching
- 2010: 2nd prize for excellence in teaching 2010, awarded by the state government of Hesse and the non-profit Hertie Foundation, for the project “Refugee Law Clinic”
- 2016: Senior Fellow, research group “The International Rule of Law – Rise or Decline?”, Berlin
