= Left and Right: The Significance of a Political Distinction =

1994 book by Norberto Bobbio

Left and Right
- Author: Norberto Bobbio
- Original title: Destra e sinistra
- Translator: Allan Cameron
- Language: Italian
- Publisher: Donzelli Editore
- Publication date: 1994
- Publication place: Italy
- English publication date: 1996
- Pages: 100
- ISBN: 8879890654

Left and Right: The Significance of a Political Distinction (Italian: Destra e sinistra) is a 1994 book by the Italian political scientist Norberto Bobbio. It is about the left–right political spectrum, which it argues is consistently useful. Bobbio equated political left and right with the distinction between equality and inequality.

== Summary ==
Bobbio argues that the political terms left and right are meaningful and consistent. He dismisses arguments that late 20th-century movements often are hard to place on the left–right political spectrum, arguing that this mainly is something left-wingers say when they try to regain power after having lost momentum.

The book goes through historical examples of how left and right have been used in politics, beginning with the French Revolution and mainly focusing on Italy. Although the fundamental metaphors of left and right are accidental, they have been used to describe a dichotomous logic that exists in political conflicts and human relations in general. They explain temporary alliances that otherwise can be unnatural and establish a common conception of good and bad.

Although the practical positions designated as left or right will vary depending on situation, there is consistency in the division. Bobbio argues that the criterion that determines left and right is the idea of equality. Left-wing movements have consistently held a "horizontal or egalitarian conception of society", where greater equality is the goal, whereas right-wing movements hold a "vertical or inegalitarian perception of society", where inequality is part of a social order.

Bobbio says a major part of the conflict is the "fundamental choices" between those—on the left—who believe that human inequality is created by society and can be removed and those—on the right—who view inequality as an inevitable consequence of natural forces. This makes left-wingers search for things that unite people, which they hope to do by reducing inequality, whereas right-wingers place more emphasis on differences and thus what makes people unequal.

== Reception ==
The book was a bestseller in Italy.

Thomas W. Gold wrote in the American Political Science Review that Bobbio's argument for the left-right distinction is convincing, but that by equating it with the distinction between equality and inequality he leaves out complexities and is generous to the left. Gold gave examples of how left-wing parties often tolerate inequality if it leads to more votes, and how the welfare state, although a project that can be motivated by equality, also creates inequality between citizens and non-citizens in "an era of mass migrations in Europe". Gold wrote that the book gives attention to the egalitarian roots of the left but does not examine the origin of the right or make distinctions between different types of right-wing movements.

In The Journal of Politics, Mark F. Griffith wrote that Left and Right succeeds at reminding readers of the usefulness of the left-right dichotomy, but must be understood in its context of Italian party politics, published at a time when it looked like the left had failed. Griffith wrote that Bobbio "compares a more moderate left-wing set of ideas to a more radical right-wing set of ideas and asks us to find the comparison compelling", and that his "obvious bias toward the Left makes this book less balanced and therefore less insightful than it could have been".
