= Anton Friedrich Justus Thibaut =

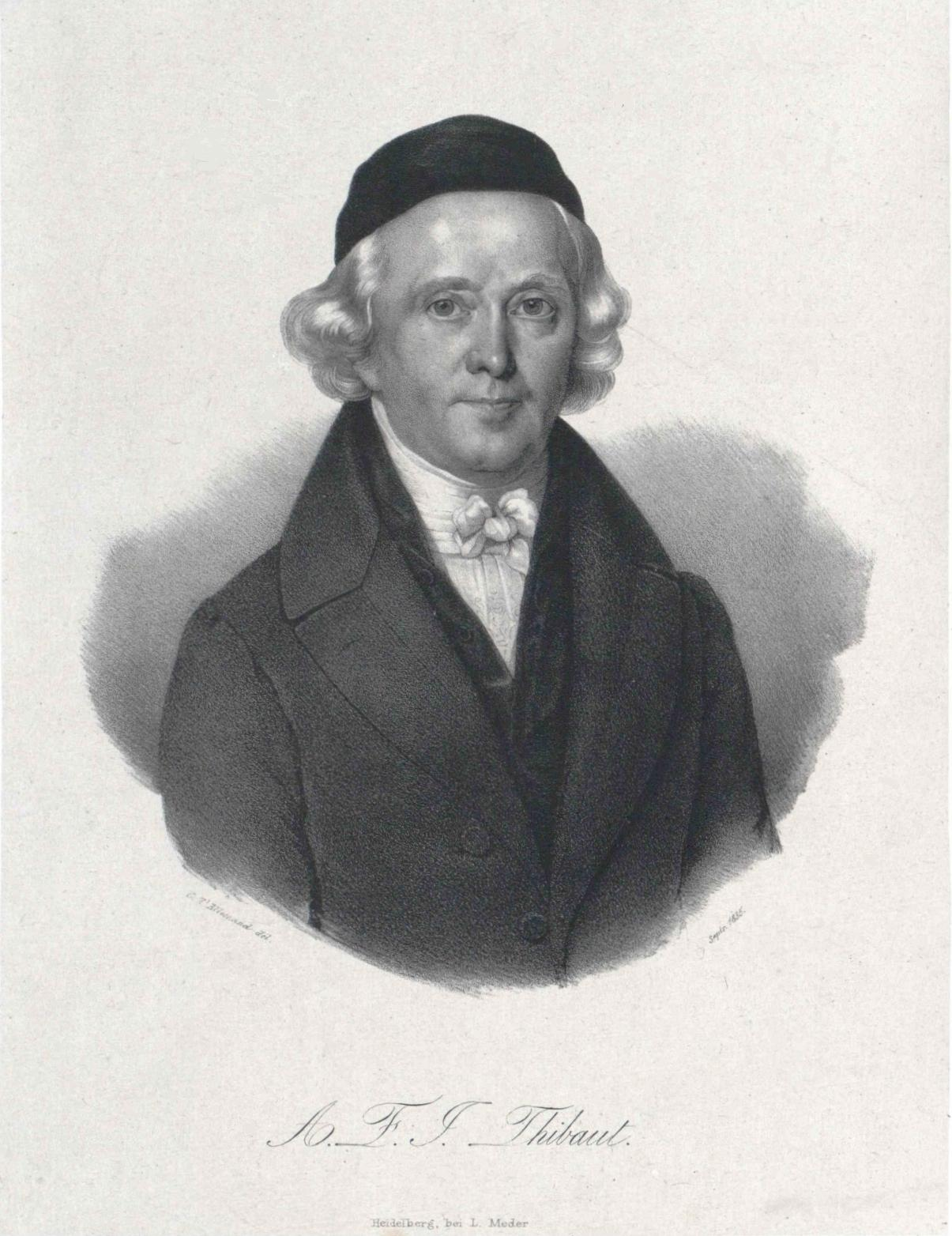
Portrait of Anton Friedrich Justus Thibaut by an unknown artist

Anton Friedrich Justus Thibaut (4 January 1772 – 20 March 1840) was a German jurist and musician.

== Early life ==
He was born at Hamelin, in Hanover, the son of an officer in the Hanoverian Army, of French Huguenot descent. After school in Hamelin and Hanover, Thibaut entered the University of Göttingen as a student of jurisprudence, went from there to Königsberg, where he studied under Immanuel Kant, and afterwards to the University of Kiel, where he was a fellow-student with Niebuhr. Here, after taking his degree of doctor of laws, he became a Privat-dozent. His younger brother was Bernhard Friedrich Thibaut, a mathematician.

== Jurist ==
=== Early career ===
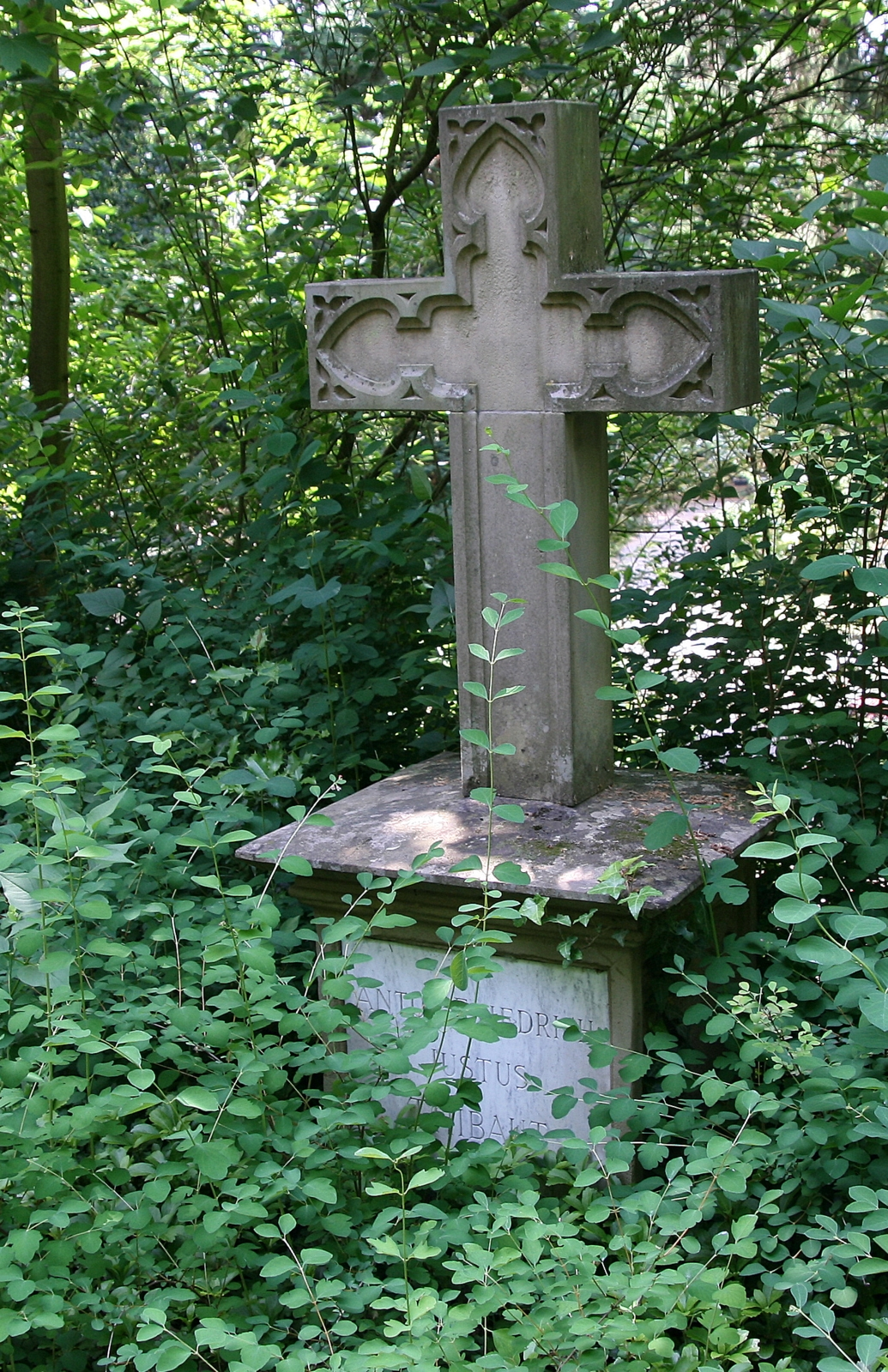
Grave in Heidelberg

In 1798 he was appointed extraordinary professor of civil law, and in the same year appeared his Versuche über einzelne Theile der Theorie des Rechts (1798), a collection of essays on the theory of law, of which by far the most important was entitled Über den Einfluss der Philosophie auf die Auslegung der positiven Gesetze, wherein he sought to show that history without philosophy could not interpret and explain law. In 1799, he published his Theorie der logischen Auslegung des römischen Rechts, one of his major works. In 1802 he published a short criticism of Feuerbach's theory of criminal law, which recalls in many ways the speculations of Jeremy Bentham. The same year appeared Über Besitz und Verjahrung, a treatise on the law of possession and the limitation of actions.

In 1802 Thibaut was called to Jena, where he spent three years and wrote, in Friedrich Schiller's summer-house, his chief work, System des Pandektenrechts (1803), which ran into many editions. The fame of this book results from its being the first modern complete compendium of the subject, distinguished alike by the accuracy of its sources and the freedom and unpedantic manner in which the subject is handled. It is, in effect, a codification of the Roman law as it then obtained in Germany, modified by canon law and the practice of the courts into a comprehensive system of Pandect law. At the invitation of the grand-duke of Baden, Thibaut went to Heidelberg to fill the chair of civil law and to assist in organizing the university; and he never left the town, though in later years, as his fame grew, he was offered places at Göttingen, Munich and Leipzig. His class was large, his influence great; and, except Gustav Hugo and Savigny, no civilian of his time was so well known.

=== Civil law essay ===
In 1814 appeared his Civilistische Abhandlungen ("Treatises on Civil Law"), of which the principal was his famous essay, the parent of so much literature, Über die Nothwendigkeit eines allgemeinen bürgerlichen Rechts für Deutschland ("On the Necessity of a General Civil Law for Germany"). It was inspired by the enthusiasm of the so-called German Wars of Liberation against Napoleon (1813–1814) and written in fourteen days. Thibaut himself explained in the Archiv für die civilistische Praxis, in 1838, the origin of this memorable essay. He had realized the change denoted by the march of German soldiers to Paris in 1814, and the happy future opened up for Germany. The system of small states he hoped and believed would continue; for the big state he considered crushing to the life of the individual and harmful as concentrating the "warm life" of the nation in one central point. In his judgment the only unity practicable and needful for Germany was that of law; and for this he urged all the German governments to labour. The essay was as much a condemnation of the entire state of jurisprudence as an argument for codification; it was a challenge to civilians to justify their very existence. Savigny took up the challenge thus thrown down when he wrote Über den Beruf unserer Zeit für Gesetzgebung und Rechtswissenschaft (1814); and a long controversy as to points not very clearly defined took place. The glory of the controversy belonged to Savigny; the real victory rested with Thibaut.

=== Later life ===
In 1819 he was appointed to the upper house of the newly constituted Baden parliament. He was also made member of the Scheidungsgericht (divorce court). In 1836 Thibaut published his Erorterungen des römischen Rechts. One of his last works was a contribution in 1838 to the Archiv für die civilistische Praxis, of which he was one of the editors (see below). Thibaut married, in 1800, a daughter of Professor Ahlers of Kiel. He died after a short illness, at Heidelberg.

== Legacy ==
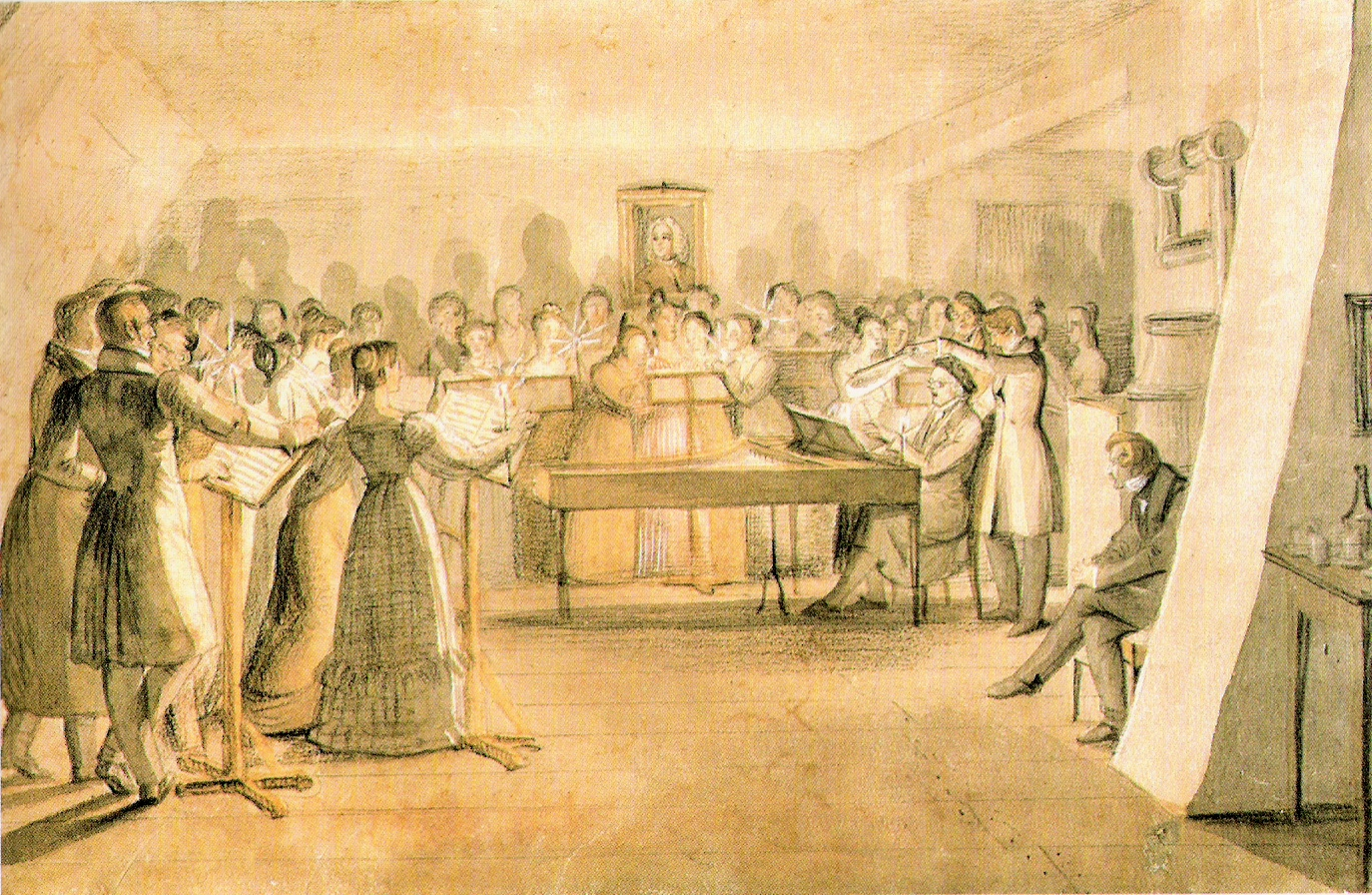
Choir practice at Thibaut's by Götzenberger

Thibaut, a man of strong personality, was much more than a jurist: he has a place in the history of music. Palestrina and the early composers of church music were his delight; and in 1824 he published, anonymously, Über die Reinheit der Tonkunst (Purity of Music), in which he eulogized the old music, especially that of Palestrina. He was an ardent collector of old compositions, and often sent young men to Italy, at his own expense, to discover interesting musical manuscripts. Among the masters of German prose, too, Thibaut has a place. His style, though simple, is richly expressive.

The framers of the new German civil code (Bürgerliches Gesetzbuch) in 1879 owed the arrangement of their matter in no small degree to Thibaut's method and clear classification, but beyond this, the code, based on the civil law of the several German states, which was adroitly blended by the usus pandectarum into an harmonious whole, does not reflect his influence. He was one of the earliest to criticize the divisions found in the Institutes, and he carried on with Gustav Hugo a controversy as to these points.

Thibaut's legal work was soon superseded by that of his successor, Karl Adolf von Vangerow (1805–1870), and his textbooks fell out of use. John Austin, who owed much to him, describes him as one "who for penetrating acuteness, rectitude of judgment and depth of learning and eloquence of exposition, may be placed by the side of Friedrich Carl von Savigny, at the head of all living civilians."
