= Andreas Paulus =

German jurist

- Born: 1968 (age 57–58)
- Education: LMU Munich
- Scientific career
- Fields: International law, constitutional law
- Workplaces: University of Göttingen; Michigan Law School
- Doctoral advisor: Bruno Simma
- Other academic advisors: Georg Nolte

Andreas L. Paulus (born 30 August 1968) is a German jurist who has been serving as a Judge on the Federal Constitutional Court of Germany since 2010. He held the chair of general international law at the University of Göttingen. His research interests include international law, humanitarian law, and constitutional law.

== Career ==
Paulus attended the University of Göttingen, the University of Geneva-affiliated Graduate Institute of International Studies, LMU Munich, and Harvard University. He received his first Staatsexamen in 1994, his second in 1996. In 2000, Paulus completed his doctoral thesis on "Die internationale Gemeinschaft im Völkerrecht" (The International Community in Public International Law) under the supervision of Bruno Simma at LMU Munich. After spending the 2003/04 academic year as Visiting Assistant Professor of Law at the University of Michigan Law School, Paulus finished his Habilitation at LMU Munich, and since 2006 holds a chair at the University of Göttingen.

On 25 February 2010, Paulus was nominated to succeed Hans-Jürgen Papier on the Federal Constitutional Court of Germany. Since March 2010, he is the successor of Papier.

Paulus was an assistant to Bruno Simma in the LaGrand case.

Currently, he is serving as the substitute member for Germany in the Venice Commission.

== Notable decisions ==
When the Federal Constitutional Court ruled on the institutional set-up of Germany’s public broadcasting corporations in March 2014, Paulus issued a dissenting opinion arguing that it is “necessary that the supervisory bodies are generally free of representatives of the executive in order to emancipate them from state influence.”

== Other activities ==
- Max Planck Institute for Comparative Public Law and International Law, Member of the Scientific Advisory Board (since 2013)
- Max Planck Institute for Innovation and Competition, Member of the Board of Trustees
- Minerva Center for Human Rights, Member of the International Advisory Board (since 2010)

== Selected publications ==
- ———; Simma, Bruno (1998), "The 'International Community': Facing the Challenge of Globalization", European Journal of International Law, 9 (2): 266–277, doi:10.1093/ejil/9.2.266, archived from the original on 2006-10-03.
- ———; Simma, Bruno (1999), "The Responsibility of Individuals for Human Rights Abuses in Internal Conflicts: A Positivist View", American Journal of International Law, 93 (2): 302–316, doi:10.2307/2997991, JSTOR 2997991, S2CID 143168066.
- ——— (2003), "The War against Iraq and the Future of International Law: Hegemony or Pluralism", Michigan Journal of International Law, 25: 691–733.
- ——— (2004), "From Neglect to Defiance? The United States and International Adjudication", European Journal of International Law, 15 (4): 783–812, doi:10.1093/ejil/15.4.783.
- ———; Nolte, Georg; Marauhn, Thilo (2007), "Possible Future Trends in International Humanitarian Law", Human Rights Law Journal, 28: 65–75.
