= Ius publicum =

Latin term meaning "public law"

Ius publicum is Latin for public law. Public law regulated the relationships of the government to its citizens, including taxation, while ius privatum (private law), based upon property and contract, concerned relations between individuals. The public/private law dichotomy is a structural core of Roman law and all modern Western legal systems. Public law will only include some areas of private law close to the end of the Roman state.

Ius publicum was used also to describe obligatory legal regulations, such as ius cogens, which is now a term used in public international law meaning basic rules which cannot (or should not) be broken, or contracted out of. Regulations that can be changed are called today ius dispositivum, and they are used when parties share something and are not in opposition.

== See also ==
- Roman law
