= Theory of Legal Norms =

1958 book by Norberto Bobbio

Theory of Legal Norms (Italian: Teoria della Norma Giuridica) is a book, published in 1958, by the Italian jurist Norberto Bobbio about one of the ontological elements of foundations of law — the legal norm.

== Importance ==
Seen by scholars as an important work in understanding of a conceptual constructivist approach of the scientific way of thinking law in the new era of the jurisprudence of values, Bobbio's book faces this challenge in six chapters.

== Chapters ==
1. Law as behavior rule: he shows three theories that lead, according to him, to a unique, non-paradoxical concept system: regulational, intersubjective and institutional.
2. Discusses the two main schools of legal theory: legal positivism and theories of natural law.
3. Approaches the norm in its formal aspect, analyzing propositions, prescriptions, expressions, imperatives, commands and advices.
4. Discusses imperatives specifically, as well as their relationship with value judgements, permissions and the addressees of a norm.
5. Sanctions of norms (prescribed consequences of their violation); the necessity of sanctions to characterize a norm.
6. Classifications of norms and the sine qua non character of generalization-abstraction.

== Criticism ==
"In this book, Bobbio defends a positive philosophy committed to the scientific soul and against metaphysical points of view. Bobbio breaks from jusnaturalists tendencies, considering law as a speech to be submitted to the language analysis, inside the borderlines of a scientific theory, according to the paradigm of the logical positivism."

"Bobbio presents his position about sanctions. According to him, sanction is the response to violation of a law. Analyzing sanction under the point of view of efficacy, the relation between law and force appears. For Kelsen, law exists to regulate force. For Bobbio, sanctions are means to obtain the desirable human behavior. Bobbio emphasizes the positive sanctions (awards) in opposition to repressive ones."

"In this book, Bobbio analyzes the law as rule of behavior, showing a general view and a criticism of the various theories that intend to reveal the concept of law, concluding that, although all the theories are integrated, the normativist one prevails in sense of constituting pressuposed of validity for the other ones"

== Bibliography ==
- Bobbio, Norberto. Teoria della Norma Giuridica (Torino: G. Giapichelli, 1958-1993). ISBN 8572833277

== See also ==
- jurisprudence of values
- natural law
- juridical system
- rule of law
