= François Gény =

French jurist and academic (1861–1959)

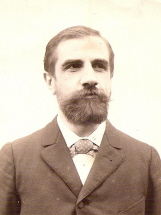
- François Gény in 1894
- Born: 17 December 1861; Baccarat, Meurthe-et-Moselle, France
- Died: 26 December 1959 (aged 98); Nancy, France
- Occupation: Jurist

François Gény (1861–1959) was a French jurist and professor of law at the University of Nancy, who introduced the notion of "free scientific research" to the interpretation of positive law.

His advocacy of judicial discretion in the interpretation of statutory law had an important influence across Europe. Gény also emphasized that judges should take into account social and economic factors when deciding cases.

== Biography ==
François Gény was the fourth child of a numerous family of 12 children. His father, Alfred Gény, was a forest warden in Baccarat (North-East of France). His mother, Marie-Eugénie Huin, was the daughter of a scrivener. Two of his brothers became priests, and another one became a teacher in the University of Roma.

François Gény studied law in Nancy (North-East of France) from 1878 to 1887. He got his diploma and became college professor, he taught Roman law in Algiers (1888–1889). He also taught civil law and international law in the University of Dijon (1890–1900), where he met another famous law teacher, Raymond Saleilles. He then taught civil law in Nancy from 1901 to 1931 and became dean of the faculty (1919–1925). He reintroduced classes of natural law named « Philosophical introduction to law study. »

In 1930, he became a member of the French Institute and received the Légion d'honneur (French highest decoration) in 1934. Nine universities conferred him the title of Doctorate Honoris Causa: Groningen (1914), Leuven (1927), Warsaw (1929), Brussels (1929), Geneva (1930), Jassy (1934), Lausanne (1935), Basel (1936) and Athens (1937). In 1933, he was elected foreign member of the Boston American Academy of Arts and Sciences.

== Legal opinions ==
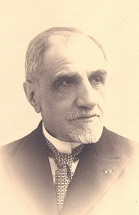
François Gény

At the end of the 19th century, the Civil code of 1804 was still the major reference in French law. The Civil Code was inspired by the French Revolution principles, where, according to Gény, judges were considered as the « mouth of the law » and obliged to apply it without any interpretations - according to Gény's own interpretation of Montesquieu, a view that has been discredited more recently in legal literature. However, François Gény decided to use an independent method based on the will of the law-maker. In his work Method of interpretation and sources of positive private law : a critical essay, published in 1899, François Gény declared that law has different implications. He noted that customs, tradition and scientific studies should be used to identify different interpretations of what is written in the law. In Science and technic in positive private law, published from 1914 to 1924, François Gény described a new method of interpretation called free scientific research with the goal to discover the origins of principles and rules. With this free scientific research, he based his studies on various "sciences" such as sociology, economics, linguistics, philosophy and theology, that previous law teachers had not used before.

== Political involvement ==
In 1936, François Gény was part of a local political group called the Lorraine national gathering. This group campaigned against the French socialist government elected in 1936.

== Selected works ==
- Essai critique sur la méthode d’interprétation juridique en vue d’une orientation nouvelle des études de droit privé ("Critical essay to juridical method of interpretation for a new orientation of private law studies")
- Université de Dijon, Revue bourguignonne de l’enseignement supérieur, t. VII de 1897 et t. VIII of 1898
- Méthode d‘interprétation et sources en droit privé positif: essai critique ("Method of interpretation and sources in positive law - critical essay"), 1899, Preface of Raymond Saleilles.
- "La technique législative dans la codification civile moderne dans le code civil." Book of the centenary, 1904, p. 989-1038.
- Les procédés d’élaboration du droit civil dans les méthodes juridiques, 1910, p. 173-196.
- Des droits sur les lettres missives principalement en vue du système positif français; essai d’application d’une méthode critique d’interprétation, 1911, 2 vol.
- Méthode d’interprétation et sources en droit privé positif, 2nd edition, 1919, 2 vol.
- Science et technique en droit privé positif: nouvelle contribution à la critique de la méthode juridique, 4 volumes published from 1914 to 1924.
- "La notion de droit en France" ("The notion of rights in France"), in Archives of philosophical law sociology, 1931.
- "La laïcité du droit naturel", in Archives of philosophical law sociology, 1933.
- "Justice et force: pour l’intégration de la force dans le droit", in studies in memory of H. Capitant, 1938, p. 241-257.
- "Evolution contemporaine de la pensée juridique dans la doctrine française", in studies offered to G.Ripert, 1950, t.I, p. 3-8.
- Ultima verba, 1951.
