= Jurisprudence of interests =

European legal doctrine of the early 20th century

In European legal history and the philosophy of law, the jurisprudence of interests is a doctrine of legal positivism of the early 20th century, according to which a written law must be interpreted to reflect the interests it is to promote. The main proponents of the jurisprudence of interests were Philipp Heck, Rudolf Müller-Erzbach, Arthur F. Bentley and Roscoe Pound.

The school of legal positivism passed through the phase of the jurisprudence of interests after the jurisprudence of concepts. In the jurisprudence of interests, one interprets a law essentially in terms of the purposes it is intended to accomplish. This doctrine is characterized by the idea of obedience to law, and subsumption as the resolution of conflicts of interests in the concrete and in the abstract, whereby the interests necessary to life in society, as materialized in that law, should prevail. It is therefore a distinctly teleological school.

== See also ==
- Jurisprudence of values
- Jurisprudence of concepts
