= Norberto Bobbio =

Italian legal scholar (1909–2004)

- Born: 18 October 1909; Turin, Italy
- Died: 9 January 2004 (aged 94); Turin, Italy

Education
- Education: University of Turin
- Academic advisor: Annibale Pastore

Philosophical work
- Era: Contemporary philosophy
- Region: Western philosophy
- School: Social liberalism
- Institutions: University of Camerino; University of Siena; University of Padua; University of Turin
- Main interests: Political philosophy; legal philosophy
- Notable ideas: Procedural democracy

Member of the Senate of the Republic
- Life tenure 18 July 1984 – 9 January 2004
- Appointed by: Sandro Pertini

Norberto Bobbio (Italian: [norˈbɛrto ˈbɔbbjo]; 18 October 1909 – 9 January 2004) was an Italian philosopher of law and political sciences and a historian of political thought. He also wrote regularly for the Turin-based daily La Stampa. Bobbio was a social liberal in the tradition of Piero Gobetti, Carlo Rosselli, Guido Calogero, and Aldo Capitini. He was also strongly influenced by Hans Kelsen and Vilfredo Pareto. He was considered one of the greatest Italian intellectuals of the 20th century.

== Early life ==
Bobbio was born in Turin on 18 October 1909 to Luigi and Rosa Caviglia. The middle-class status of his family (his father was a doctor) allowed Bobbio to have a comfortable childhood. He wrote verses and loved Bach and Verdi's opera La traviata. Later, he would develop an unknown illness that caused tiredness and malaise. The feeling worsened with age but became an important part of his intellectual growth.

Bobbio studied at the Liceo Classico Massimo d'Azeglio, where he met Leone Ginzburg, Cesare Pavese, and Vittorio Foa, who would all become major figures in the culture of the Italian Republic. From 1928, like many other youth in the era, Bobbio registered with the National Fascist Party.

== Life and views ==
In high school, Bobbio met Vittorio Foa, Leone Ginzburg and Cesare Pavese, and at the university, he became a friend of Alessandro Galante Garrone.

In 1942, under the Fascist regime of Benito Mussolini and during World War II, Bobbio joined the Partito d'Azione ("Party of Action"), illegal at the time, and was imprisoned in 1943 and 1944. He was a candidate in the 1946 Constituent Assembly of Italy elections, but failed to win a seat. With the party's failure in a post-war Italy dominated by the Christian Democrats, Bobbio left electoral politics and returned his focus to academia.

He was one of the major exponents of left-right political distinctions, arguing that the Left believes in attempting to eradicate social inequality, while the Right regards most social inequality as the result of ineradicable natural inequalities, and sees attempts to enforce social equality as utopian or authoritarian.

A strong advocate of the rule of law, the separation of powers, and the limitation of powers, he was a socialist, but opposed to what he perceived as the anti-democratic, authoritarian elements in most of Marxism. He was a strong partisan of the Historic Compromise between the Italian Communist Party and the Christian Democrats, and a fierce critic of Silvio Berlusconi. Bobbio died in Turin, the same city in which he was born and lived most of his life.

== Academic career and honours ==
Bobbio studied philosophy of law with Gioele Solari; he later taught this subject in Camerino, Siena, Padua, and ultimately back in Turin as Solari's successor in 1948; from 1972 to 1984, he was a professor of political science in Turin.

He was a National Associate of the Lincean Academy and longtime co-director of the Rivista di Filosofia. He became a Corresponding Associate of the British Academy in 1966; in 1984, he was nominated as Senator-for-life by Italian President Sandro Pertini.

The awards received by Bobbio include:

- Election into the American Academy of Arts and Sciences in 1994
- The 1994 Balzan Prize for Law and Political Science (Governments and Democracy)
- The 2000 Hegel Prize for a contribution to the development of the humanities

Bobbio also received, among others, doctorates honoris causa from the Universities of Paris (Nanterre), Madrid (Complutense), Bologna, Chambéry, Madrid (Carlos III), Sassari, Camerino, Madrid (Autónoma), and Buenos Aires.

To celebrate the centenary of Norberto Bobbio's birth, a committee was established, constituted by more than a hundred Italian and international public institutions and intellectual figures, which formulated a wide-ranging programme of activities to promote dialogue and reflection on the thought and figure of Bobbio, and on the future of democracy, culture and civilisation. Celebrations were officially opened on 10 January 2009 at the University of Turin.

== Public intellectual ==
According to Richard Bellamy, Bobbio was a public intellectual and throughout his life worked on several causes, including the defence of social democracy and supporting nuclear disarmament.

== Major works ==
Bobbio's first book was The Phenomenological Turn in Social and Legal Philosophy (1934). It was followed by The Use of Analogy in Legal Logic (1938) and The Philosophy of Decadence (1944).

Next, Bobbio sought to elaborate a general theory of law, a project that was influenced by Hans Kelsen's work. This research led to the publication of A Theory of Judicial Norms (1958) and A Theory of the Legal Order (1960).

Coinciding with his new position as chair in Politics at Turin in 1972, Bobbio turned his attention from a pure theory of law to more political issues. He wrote on Hobbes, Mosca, and Pareto.

Publications from this period that address the rule of law, rights, and democracy include: Which Socialism? (1976); The Future of Democracy: A Defense of the Rules of the Game (1984); State, Government and Society (1985); The Age of Rights (1990).

Liberalism and Democracy (1985) explores the relationship between liberalism and democracy, highlighting tensions and complementarities. Other works include The Problem of War and the Roads to Peace (1979); The Absent Third (1989); and A Just War? (1991).

== Political thought ==
Bobbio defended the view that "the only way a meaningful discussion of democracy, as distinct from all forms of autocratic government, ... is to consider it as characterized by a set of rules (primary or basic) which establish who is authorised to take collective decisions and which procedures are to be applied. Every social group needs to take decisions binding on all members of the group so as to ensure its own survival."

== Major works ==
- L'indirizzo fenomenologico nella filosofia sociale e giuridica (The Phenomenological Turn in Social and Legal Philosophy, 1934)
- Scienza e tecnica del diritto (The Science and Technical Aspects of Law, 1934)
- L'analogia nella logica del diritto (The Use of Analogy in Legal Logic, 1938)
- La consuetudine come fatto normativo (Custom as a Normative Fact, 1942)
- La filosofia del decadentismo (The Philosophy of Decadence, 1945)
- Teoria della scienza giuridica (Theory of Legal Science, 1950)
- Politica e cultura (Politics and Culture, 1955)
- Studi sulla teoria generale del diritto (Essays in the General Theory of Law, 1955)
- Teoria della norma giuridica (Theory of Legal Norms, 1958)
- Teoria dell'ordinamento giuridico (A Theory of Legal Order, 1960)
- Profilo ideologico del Novecento italiano (An Ideological Profile of Twentieth Century Italy, 1960)
- Il positivismo giuridico (Legal Positivism, 1961)
- Locke e il diritto naturale (Locke and Natural Law, 1963)
- Italia civile (Civil Italy, 1964)
- Giusnaturalismo e positivismo giuridico (Natural Law and Legal Positivism, 1965)
- Da Hobbes a Marx (From Hobbes to Marx, 1965)
- Saggi sulla scienza politica in Italia (Tests of Political Science in Italy, 1969)
- Diritto e Stato nel pensiero di E. Kant (Law and State in the Thought of Immanuel Kant, 1969)
- Ideological Profile of Italy in the Twentieth Century (1969)
- Una filosofia militante: studi su Carlo Cattaneo (A Militant Philosopher: Essays on Carlo Cattaneo, 1971)
- On Mosca and Pareto (1972)
- Quale socialismo (1976) (Which Socialism? Marxism, Socialism and Democracy, 1986)
- I problemi della guerra e le vie della pace (The Problem of War and the Roads to Peace, 1979)
- Studi hegeliani (Hegelian Essays, 1981)
- Il futuro della democrazia (The Future of Democracy: A Defence Of The Rules Of The Game, 1984)
- Maestri e compagni (Teachers and Companions, 1984)
- “The Future of Democracy”. Telos 61 (Fall 1984). New York: Telos Press
- Liberalismo e democrazia (Liberalism and democracy, 1985)
- State, Government and Society (Democracy and Dictatorship: The Nature and Limits of State Power, 1985)
- Il terzo assente (The Absent Third, 1988)
- Thomas Hobbes (1989)
- L'età dei diritti (The Rule of Law, 1989)
- The Age of Rights (English-language publication, 1990)
- A Just War? (1991), a defense of the Gulf War, about which he later changed his mind.
- Destra e sinistra (Right and Left), Roma, 1994
- In Praise of Meekness (1994)
- De senectute (Of Old Age; the Latin title is an allusion to Cicero's Cato Maior de Senectute, 1996)
- Autobiografia (Autobiography, 1999)
- Teoria Generale della Politica (General Theory of Politics, 1999)
- Dialogo intorno alla repubblica (Dialogue about the Republic, 2001)
- Etica e politica: Scritti di impegno civile (Ethics and Politics: writings on civil obligation), ed. Marco Revelli. Milano: Mondadori, 2009.
