= German historical school =

Philosophical movement

This is an article about a school of thought in the area of law. For economics, see historical school of economics.

The German historical school of jurisprudence is a 19th-century intellectual movement in the study of German law. With Romanticism as its background, it conceived of law as the organic expression of a national consciousness (Volksgeist). It stood in opposition to an earlier movement called Vernunftrecht ('rational law').

== Overview ==
The historical school is based on the writings and teachings of Gustav Hugo and especially Friedrich Carl von Savigny. Natural lawyers held that law could be discovered only by rational deduction from the nature of man.

The basic premise of the German historical school is that law is not to be regarded as an arbitrary grouping of regulations laid down by some authority. Rather, those regulations are to be seen as the expression of the convictions of the people, in the same manner as language, customs and practices are expressions of the people. To the historical school, the law is grounded in a form of popular consciousness called the Volksgeist, and as this popular consciousness developed over time throughout history, the law organically developed as well.

In the evolution of a legal system, it is a lawyer’s professional duty understood within the broader social division of labour to ground scholarly work in an accurate determination of the people’s will. By doing so, lawyers are seen to embody that popular will.

The German historical school was divided into Romanists and Germanists. The Romanists, to whom Savigny also belonged, held that the Volksgeist springs from the reception of Roman law, while the Germanists (Karl Friedrich Eichhorn, Jakob Grimm, Georg Beseler, Otto von Gierke) saw medieval German law as the expression of the German Volksgeist.

The German historical school has had considerable influence on the academic study of law in Germany. Georg Friedrich Puchta and Bernhard Windscheid continued the Romanist vein founded by Savigny, leading to the so-called Pandektenwissenschaft which is seen as Begriffsjurisprudenz ('conceptual jurisprudence').

== Criticism ==
Karl Marx devoted an 1842 essay "The philosophical manifesto of the historical school of law" to criticizing the historical school of law, calling it the "sole frivolous product" of the eighteenth century.

Hugo misinterprets his teacher Kant by supposing that because we cannot know what is true, we consequently allow the untrue, if it exists at all, to pass as fully valid. He is a sceptic as regards the necessary essence of things, so as to be a courtier as regards their accidental appearance. ... Everything existing serves him as an authority, every authority serves him as an argument.

== See also ==
- Historism
