= Karl Friedrich Eichhorn =

German jurist (1781–1854)

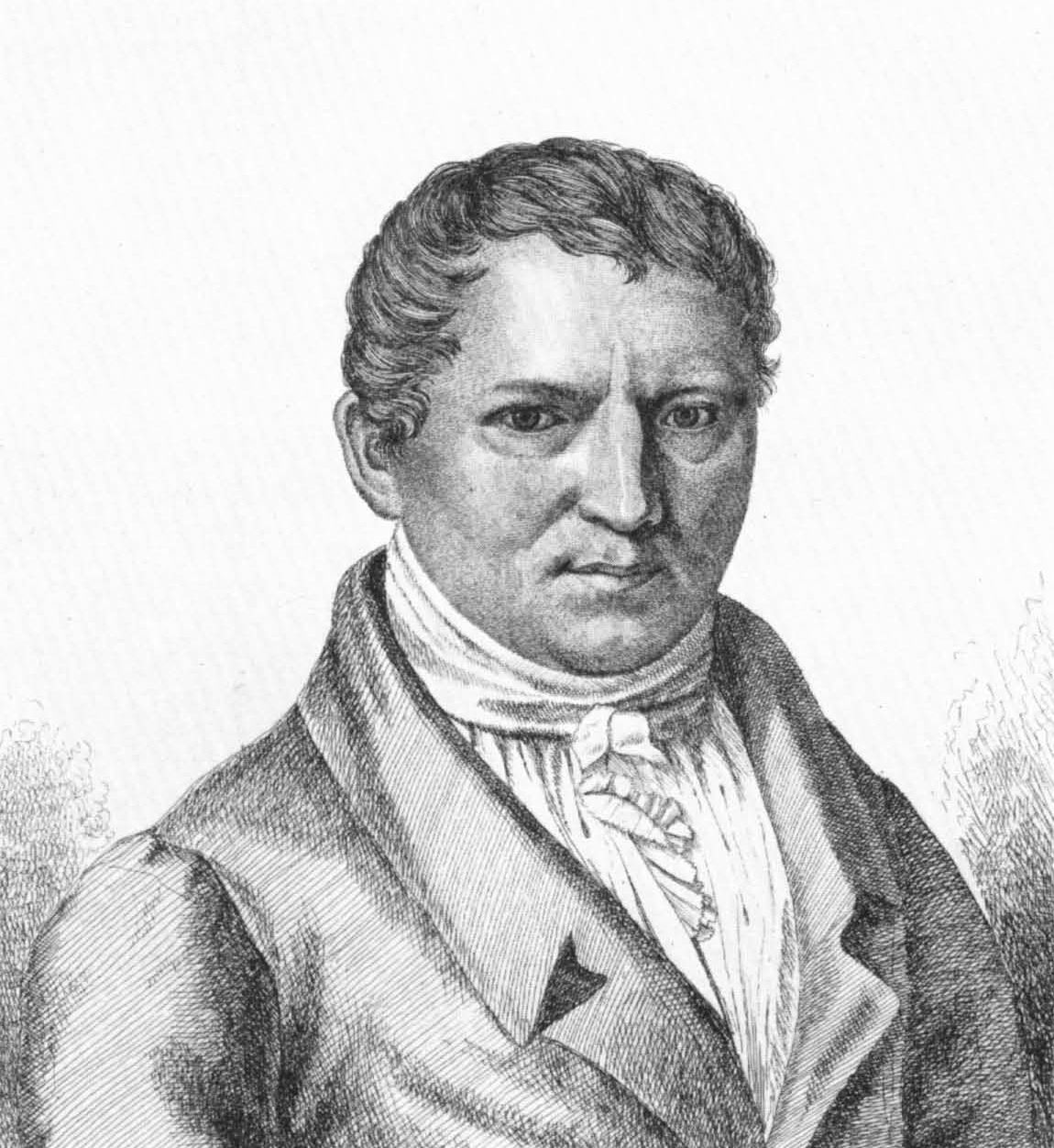
Karl Friedrich Eichhorn

Karl Friedrich Eichhorn (20 November 1781 – 4 July 1854) was a German jurist.

== Life ==
Eichhorn was born in Jena as the son of Johann Gottfried Eichhorn. He entered the University of Göttingen in 1797. In 1805 he obtained the professorship of law at Frankfurt (Oder), holding it until 1811, when he accepted the same chair at the new Friedrich Wilhelm University in Berlin. On the call to arms in 1813 he became a captain of horse, and received the Iron Cross at the end of the war.

In 1817 he was offered the chair of law at Göttingen, and, preferring it to the Berlin professorship, taught there with great success until ill-health compelled him to resign in 1828. His successor in the Berlin chair having died in 1832, he again entered on its duties, but resigned two years afterwards. In 1832 he also received an appointment in the ministry of foreign affairs, which, with his labours on many state committees and his legal researches and writings, occupied him until his death in Cologne. He was furthermore a member of the Prussian Supreme Tribunal.

Eichhorn was regarded as one of the principal authorities on German constitutional law. His chief work is Deutsche Staats- und Rechtsgeschichte (Göttingen, 1808–1823, 5th edition 1843–1844). In company with Friedrich Carl von Savigny and Johann Friedrich Ludwig Göschen he founded the Zeitschrift für geschichtliche Rechtswissenschaft. He was the author besides of Einleitung in das deutsche Privatrecht mit Einschluss des Lehenrechts (Gött., 1823) and the Grundsätze des Kirchenrechts der Katholischen und der Evangelischen Religionspartei in Deutschland, 2 Bde. (ib., 1831–1833).

== Awards and decorations ==
- Iron Cross of 1813
- Pour le Mérite for Arts and Sciences (1842)
- Order of the Red Eagle (Prussia, 1847)
- Maximilian Order for Science and Art (Bavaria, 1853)

== See also ==
- German Historical School of Law
