= Gustav Hugo =

German jurist (1764–1844)

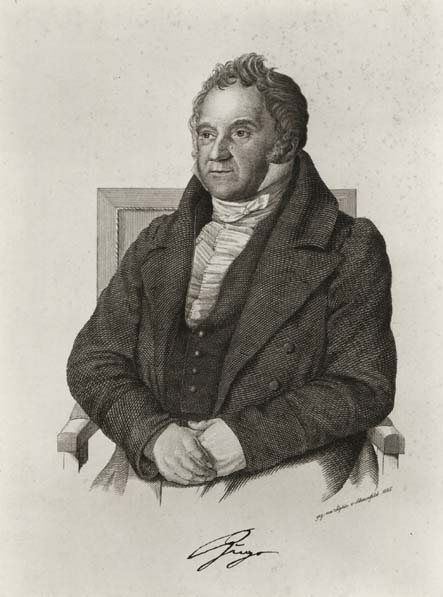
- Born: Gustav Conrad Hugo; 23 November 1764; Lörrach, Margraviate of Baden, Holy Roman Empire
- Died: 15 September 1844 (aged 79); Göttingen, Kingdom of Hanover, German Confederation

Philosophical work
- Era: 19th-century philosophy
- Region: Western philosophy: German philosophy
- School: German historical school
- Main interests: Jurisprudence; Legal philosophy

Gustav Conrad Hugo (23 November 1764 – 15 September 1844) was a German jurist.

== Biography ==
Hugo was born at Lörrach in the Margraviate of Baden. From the gymnasium at Karlsruhe, he passed in 1782 to the University of Göttingen, where he studied law for three years. Having received the appointment of tutor to the prince of Anhalt-Dessau, he took his doctor's degree at the University of Halle in 1788. Recalled in the same year to Göttingen as extraordinary professor of law, he became a full professor in 1792. In the preface to his Beiträge zur civilistischen Bucherkenntniss der letzten vierzig Jahre (1828–1829), he gives a sketch of the condition of the civil law teaching at Göttingen at that time.

The Roman and German elements of the existing law were, without criticism or differentiation, welded into an ostensible whole for practical needs, with the result that it was difficult to say whether historical truth or practical ends were most prejudiced. As it was passed from person to person, new errors crept in, and even the best of teachers could not escape from the false method which had become traditional. These were the evils which Hugo set himself to combat, and he became the founder of the German Historical School of jurisprudence which was continued and further developed by Savigny. His magna opera are the Lehrbuch eines civilistischen Cursus (7 vols., 1792–1821), in which his method is thoroughly worked out, and Civilistisches Magazin (6 vols., 1790–1837).

Hugo was criticized, and ridiculed, by Karl Marx in the Rheinische Zeitung as a founder of the historical school and for justifying the "law of arbitrary power", among other things.

== Publications ==
Major publications of Gustav Hugo include:

- Hugo, Gustav (1789). Institution des heutigen Römischen Rechts (in German). Berlin: August Mylius.
- Hugo, Gustav (1792). Lehrbuch der juristischen Encyclopädie (in German). Vol. Lehrbuch eines civilistischen Cursus I (1 ed.). Berlin: August Mylius.
- Hugo, Gustav (1798). Lehrbuch des Naturrechts (in German). Vol. Lehrbuch eines civilistischen Cursus II (1 ed.). Berlin: August Mylius.
- Hugo, Gustav (1790). Lehrbuch der Rechtsgeschichte (in German). Vol. Lehrbuch eines civilistischen Cursus III (1 ed.). Berlin: August Mylius.
- Hugo, Gustav (1790). Lehrbuch des heutigen Römischen Rechts (in German). Vol. Lehrbuch eines civilistischen Cursus IV (1 ed.). Berlin: August Mylius.
- Hugo, Gustav (1802). Philosophische Encyclopädie (in German). Vol. Lehrbuch eines civilistischen Cursus V (1 ed.). Berlin: August Mylius.
- Hugo, Gustav (1812). Civilistische Literärgeschichte (in German). Vol. Lehrbuch eines civilistischen Cursus VI (1 ed.). Berlin: August Mylius.
- Hugo, Gustav (1802). Chrestomathie von Beweisstellen für das heutige Römische Recht (in German). Vol. Lehrbuch eines civilistischen Cursus VII (1 ed.). Berlin: August Mylius.
- Hugo, Gustav (1828). Beyträge zur civilistischen Bücherkenntniß (in German). Vol. 1 (1 ed.). Berlin: August Mylius.
- Hugo, Gustav (1829). Beyträge zur civilistischen Bücherkenntniß (in German). Vol. 2 (1 ed.). Berlin: August Mylius.
- Hugo, Gustav (1844). Beyträge zur civilistischen Bücherkenntniß (in German). Vol. 3 (1 ed.). Berlin: August Mylius.
