= Jurisprudence of values =

School of legal philosophy

Jurisprudence of values or jurisprudence of principles is a school of legal philosophy. This school represents, according to some authors, a step in overcoming the contradictions of legal positivism (Note: It is a school that has, since the end of the 19th century, characterized the law as a dogmatic institution, or man's imposition over man, in opposition to the former school, legal naturalism, that treated law as a result of metaphysical-rationalist and scientific sources (natural consequence of the other sciences' conclusions and even work of God). The image of legal positivism nonetheless has deteriorated because of being used to favor class oppression.) and, for this reason, it has been considered by some authors as a post-positivism school. Jurisprudence of values is referred to in various works all over the world.

This modus of thinking of focuses on constitutional principles. (Note: The principle, as opposed to the legal rule, is more subjective, and the traditional interpretation gave it minor importance. Jurisprudence of values focuses on achieving the ideals underlying these legal principles.)

The jurisprudence of values centers on the concepts of incidence and interpretation of the legal norm, as well as rules and principles, and concepts like equality, freedom, and justice.

== Juridical norms ==
According to Pontes de Miranda, "The juridical rule is the norm with which the man, willing to subordinate the events to an order and foreseeability, tries to distribute the life's goods". Mankind seeks to somehow control the facts; the juridical norm is used as a tool to decide what is right and wrong. The norm, according to this school, is seen as a creation of man, thus man is controlling man.

Pontes de Miranda explains the concept of fact support. Fact support is the fact that is previewed by the norm; it is the abstract fact; it is the fact that, if it is verified true in the world of facts the norm will fall upon it. In other words, there is a world of concrete facts and there is another world of ideas or types. Thus, the legislator tries to use words to group possible concrete facts into sets, related to the world of ideas. This paradigm makes possible to attribute judicial effects to life's facts.

== See also ==
- Hermeneutics
- Jurisprudence of concepts
- Jurisprudence of interests
- Philosophy of law
- Legal naturalism
- Legal positivism
