= List of judgments of the Supreme Court of the United Kingdom delivered in 2016 =

This is a list of the judgments given by the Supreme Court of the United Kingdom in the year 2016. 65 cases were decided and these are ordered by neutral citation.

In 2016 Lord Neuberger of Abbotsbury was the President of the Supreme Court; Lady Hale of Richmond was the Deputy President.

The table lists judgments made by the court and the opinions of the judges in each case. Judges are treated as having concurred in another's judgment when they either formally attach themselves to the judgment of another or speak only to acknowledge their concurrence with one or more judges. Any judgment which reaches a conclusion which differs from the majority on one or more major points of the appeal has been treated as dissent.

All dates are for 2016 unless expressly stated otherwise.

== 2016 case summaries ==
Unless otherwise noted, cases were heard by a panel of 5 judges.

Cases involving Scots law are highlighted in orange. Cases involving Northern Irish law are highlighted in green.

Case name	Citation	Decided	Legal subject	Summary of decision
Mirga v Secretary of State for Work and Pensions	[2016] UKSC 1	27 January	Social security	It was lawful to deny a pregnant Polish woman income support under UK and EU law, and to deny an Iraqi man housing under the Housing Act 1996 .
R (C) v Secretary of State for Justice	[2016] UKSC 2	27 January		Anonymity
Youssef v Secretary of State for Foreign and Commonwealth Affairs	[2016] UKSC 3	27 January		Asset freezing
Re B (A Child)	[2016] UKSC 4	3 February		Jurisdiction; Children Act 1989
R v Taylor	[2016] UKSC 5	3 February	Criminal law	
Kennedy v Cordia (Services) LLP	[2016] UKSC 6	10 February	Tort law	Negligence
Shop Direct Group v Commissioners for Her Majesty's Revenue and Customs	[2016] UKSC 7	17 February	Tax law	VAT
R v Jogee	[2016] UKSC 8	18 February	Criminal law	Joint enterprise
Knauer v Ministry of Justice	[2016] UKSC 9	24 February	Tort law	Mesothelioma; Damages
Cox v Ministry of Justice	[2016] UKSC 10	2 March	Tort law	Vicarious liability
Mr A M Mohamud v WM Morrison Supermarkets plc	[2016] UKSC 11	2 March	Tort law	Vicarious liability
PMS International Group Plc v Magmatic Ltd	[2016] UKSC 12	9 March	Intellectual property	
DB Group Services Ltd v Commissioners for Her Majesty's Revenue and Customs	[2016] UKSC 13	9 March	Tax law	
Lynn Shellfish Ltd v Loose	[2016] UKSC 14	13 April	Land law	Fishing industry in England
In the matter of N (Children)	[2016] UKSC 15	13 April	Conflict of laws	Jurisdiction and Brussels II.
R (Nouazli) v Secretary of State for the Home Department	[2016] UKSC 16	20 April	Immigration law	
Asset Land Investment Plc v The Financial Conduct Authority	[2016] UKSC 17	20 April		Collective investment schemes
The Mayor's Office for Policing and Crime v Mitsui Sumitomo Insurance Co (Europe) Ltd	[2016] UKSC 18	20 April	Tort law	The proper scope of compensation under the Riot (Damages) Act 1886 in an insurance policy.
R (O) v Secretary of State for the Home Department	[2016] UKSC 19	27 April		False imprisonment
NYK Bulkship (Atlantic) NV v Cargill International SA	[2016] UKSC 20	11 May		Maritime law
Airtours Holidays Transport Ltd v Commissioners for Her Majesty's Revenue and Customs	[2016] UKSC 21	11 May	Tax law	VAT
In the matter of an application by JR55 for Judicial Review	[2016] UKSC 22	11 May		Judicial review
PST Energy 7 Shipping LLC v O W Bunker Malta Ltd	[2016] UKSC 23	11 May		Maritime law
Eclipse Film Partners No 35 LLP v Commissioners for Her Majesty's Revenue and Customs	[2016] UKSC 24	11 May		Tribunals, Courts and Enforcement Act 2007
Ministry of Defence v Iraqi Civilians	[2016] UKSC 25	12 May		Civil Code of Iraq
PJS v News Group Newspapers	[2016] UKSC 26	19 May	Tort law	Privacy law; Injunctions
McBride v Scottish Police Authority	[2016] UKSC 27	15 June	Labour law	Shirley McKie
McDonald v McDonald	[2016] UKSC 28	15 June	Land law	ECHR article 8
BNY Mellon Corporate Trustee Services Ltd v LBG Capital No. 1 Plc	[2016] UKSC 29	16 June	Banking law	
Brown v Stonegale Ltd	[2016] UKSC 30	22 June	Company law	
Taiwo v Olaigbe	[2016] UKSC 31	22 June	Labour law	Equality Act 2010
MP (Sri Lanka) v Secretary of State for the Home Department	[2016] UKSC 32	22 June	Immigration law	
MS (Uganda) (Appellant) v Secretary of State for the Home Department	[2016] UKSC 33	22 June	Immigration law	
In the matter of D (A Child)	[2016] UKSC 34	22 June		Family law
R (Bancoult (No 2)) v Secretary of State for Foreign and Commonwealth Affairs	[2016] UKSC 35	29 June		British Overseas Territories
Goluchowski v District Court in Elblag, Poland	[2016] UKSC 36	29 June		European Arrest Warrant
R (Ismail) v Secretary of State for the Home Department	[2016] UKSC 37	6 July		Serving foreign judgments
Campbell v Gordon	[2016] UKSC 38	6 July	Labour law	Employers' Liability (Compulsory Insurance) Act 1969
R (The Public Law Project) v Lord Chancellor	[2016] UKSC 39	13 July		Legal aid
Edwards v Kumarasamy	[2016] UKSC 40	13 July	Land law	Landlord–tenant law
Amoena (UK) Ltd v Commissioners for Her Majesty's Revenue and Customs	[2016] UKSC 41	13 July		Bras
Patel v Mirza	[2016] UKSC 42	20 July	Contract law	Illegality of contracts
Willers v Joyce (1)	[2016] UKSC 43	20 July	Tort law	Malicious prosecution
Willers v Joyce (2)	[2016] UKSC 44	20 July		Precedent; Judicial Committee of the Privy Council
Versloot Dredging BV and another v HDI Gerling Industrie Versicherung AG	[2016] UKSC 45	20 July	Commercial law	Marine insurance
Lee-Hirons v Secretary of State for Justice	[2016] UKSC 46	27 July		Mental health law
Bailey v Angove's PTY Ltd	[2016] UKSC 47	27 July	Commercial law	Law of agency
Hayward v Zurich Insurance Company plc	[2016] UKSC 48	27 July	Tort law	The deceitful misrepresentation of a workplace injury
Secretary of State for the Home Department v Franco Vomero (Italy)	[2016] UKSC 49	27 July	Immigration law	
Hastings Borough Council v Manolete Partners Plc	[2016] UKSC 50	27 July		Hastings Pier
The Christian Institute v The Lord Advocate	[2016] UKSC 51	28 July	Constitutional law	ECHR article 8 and reserved matters
Moreno v The Motor Insurers' Bureau	[2016] UKSC 52	3 August		Damages
MB v Secretary of State for Work and Pensions	[2016] UKSC 53	10 August		Legal status of transgender people
R (Ingenious Media Holdings plc v Commissioners for Her Majesty's Revenue and Customs)	[2016] UKSC 54	19 October	Constitutional law	ECHR article 8
R v Mitchell	[2016] UKSC 55	19 October		Bad character evidence
R (Johnson) v Secretary of State for the Home Department	[2016] UKSC 56	19 October	Constitutional law	Human Rights Act 1998
Impact Funding Solutions Ltd v AIG Europe Insurance Ltd (formerly known as Chartis Insurance (UK) Ltd)	[2016] UKSC 57	26 October	Contract law	
R (Rutherford) v Secretary of State for Work and Pensions	[2016] UKSC 58	9 November		Under-occupancy penalty
Makhlouf v Secretary of State for the Home Department (Northern Ireland)	[2016] UKSC 59	16 November	Constitutional law	Criminal deportation and ECHR article 8
Hesham Ali (Iraq) v Secretary of State for the Home Department	[2016] UKSC 60	16 November		Criminal deportation; ECHR Article 8
R v Golds	[2016] UKSC 61	30 November	Criminal law	Murder
R v Docherty	[2016] UKSC 62	14 December		Sentencing
R (Mirza) v Secretary of State for the Home Department	[2016] UKSC 63	14 December	Immigration law	
Habib Khan v General Pharmaceutical Council	[2016] UKSC 64	14 December		Professional ethics
R v Guraj	[2016] UKSC 65	14 December		Confiscation

== 2016 opinions ==
Delivered a judgment (majority)	Concurred in the judgment of another justice (majority)	Delivered a judgment (dissenting)	Concurred in the judgment of another justice (dissent)	Did not participate in the decision

Case name	Citation	Argued	Decided	Neuberger of Abbotsbury	Hale of Richmond	Mance	Kerr of Tonagmore	Clarke of Stone-cum-Ebony	Wilson of Culworth	Sumption	Reed	Carnwath of Notting Hill	Hughes of Ombersley	Toulson	Hodge
Mirga v Secretary of State for Work and Pensions	[2016] UKSC 1	9–10 March 2015	27 January
R (on the application of C) v Secretary of State for Justice	[2016] UKSC 2	26 October 2015	27 January
Youssef v Secretary of State for Foreign and Commonwealth Affairs	[2016] UKSC 3	18–19 November 2015	27 January
Re B (A Child)	[2016] UKSC 4	8–9 December 2015	3 February
R v Taylor	[2016] UKSC 5	15 December 2015	3 February
Kennedy v Cordia (Services) LLP	[2016] UKSC 6	19 October 2015	10 February
Shop Direct Group v Commissioners for Her Majesty's Revenue and Customs	[2016] UKSC 7	9–10 December 2015	17 February
R v Jogee	[2016] UKSC 8	27–29 October 2015	18 February
Knauer v Ministry of Justice	[2016] UKSC 9	28 January	24 February
Cox v Ministry of Justice	[2016] UKSC 10	12–13 October 2015	2 March
Mr A M Mohamud v WM Morrison Supermarkets plc	[2016] UKSC 11	12–13 October 2015	2 March
PMS International Group Plc v Magmatic Ltd	[2016] UKSC 12	3 November 2015	9 March
DB Group Services Ltd v Commissioners for Her Majesty's Revenue and Customs	[2016] UKSC 13	3 December 2015	9 March
Lynn Shellfish Ltd v Loose	[2016] UKSC 14	9–10 February	13 April
In the matter of N (Children)	[2016] UKSC 15	17 March	13 April
R (on the application of Nouazli) v Secretary of State for the Home Department	[2016] UKSC 16	23–24 November 2015	20 April
Asset Land Investment Plc v The Financial Conduct Authority	[2016] UKSC 17	13–14 January	20 April
The Mayor's Office for Policing and Crime v Mitsui Sumitomo Insurance Co (Europe) Ltd	[2016] UKSC 18	21 January	20 April
R (on the application of O) (by her litigation friend the Official Solicitor) v Secretary of State for the Home Department	[2016] UKSC 19	19–20 January	27 April
NYK Bulkship (Atlantic) NV v Cargill International SA	[2016] UKSC 20	1 December 2015	11 May
Airtours Holidays Transport Ltd v Commissioners for Her Majesty's Revenue and Customs	[2016] UKSC 21	25 February	11 May
In the matter of an application by JR55 for Judicial Review	[2016] UKSC 22	8 March	11 May
PST Energy 7 Shipping LLC v O W Bunker Malta Ltd	[2016] UKSC 23	22–3 March	11 May
Eclipse Film Partners No 35 LLP v Commissioners for Her Majesty's Revenue and Customs	[2016] UKSC 24	13 April	11 May
Ministry of Defence v Iraqi Civilians	[2016] UKSC 25	25 April	12 May
PJS v News Group Newspapers Ltd	[2016] UKSC 26	21 April	19 May
McBride v Scottish Police Authority	[2016] UKSC 27	3 March	15 June
McDonald v McDonald	[2016] UKSC 28	15–16 March	15 June
BNY Mellon Corporate Trustee Services Ltd v LBG Capital No. 1 Plc	[2016] UKSC 29	21 March	16 June
Brown and another, the Joint Administrators of Loanwell Ltd. v Stonegale Ltd.	[2016] UKSC 30	15 February	22 June
Taiwo v Olaigbe	[2016] UKSC 31	20–21 April	22 June
MP (Sri Lanka) v Secretary of State for the Home Department	[2016] UKSC 32	11 May	22 June
MS (Uganda) v Secretary of State for the Home Department	[2016] UKSC 33	12 May	22 June
In the matter of D (A child)	[2016] UKSC 34	23 May	22 June
R (on the application of Bancoult (No 2)) v Secretary of State for Foreign and Commonwealth Affairs	[2016] UKSC 35	22 June 2015	29 June
Goluchowski v District Court in Elblag, Poland	[2016] UKSC 36	14 March	29 June
R (on the application of Ismail) v Secretary of State for the Home Department	[2016] UKSC 37	26–27 January	6 July
Campbell v Gordon	[2016] UKSC 38	12 April	6 July
R (on the application of The Public Law Project) v Lord Chancellor	[2016] UKSC 39	18 April	13 July
Edwards v Kumarasamy	[2016] UKSC 40	5 May	13 July
Amoena (UK) Ltd v Commissioners for Her Majesty's Revenue and Customs	[2016] UKSC 41	7 June	13 July
Patel v Mirza	[2016] UKSC 42	16–17 February	20 July
Willers v Joyce and another (in substitution for and in their capacity as executors of Albert Gubay (deceased)) (1)	[2016] UKSC 43	7 March	20 July
Willers v Joyce and another (in substitution for and in their capacity as executors of Albert Gubay (deceased)) (2)	[2016] UKSC 44	7 March	20 July
Versloot Dredging BV and another v HDI Gerling Industrie Versicherung AG	[2016] UKSC 45	16–17 March	20 July
Lee-Hirons v Secretary of State for Justice	[2016] UKSC 46	26 April	27 July
Bailey v Angove's PTY Ltd	[2016] UKSC 47	8 June	27 July
Hayward v Zurich Insurance Company plc	[2016] UKSC 48	16 June	27 July
Secretary of State for the Home Department v Franco Vomero (Italy)	[2016] UKSC 49	21 June	27 July
Hastings Borough Council v Manolete Partners Plc	[2016] UKSC 50	23 June	27 July
The Christian Institute v The Lord Advocate	[2016] UKSC 51	8–9 March	28 July
Moreno v The Motor Insurers' Bureau	[2016] UKSC 52	12–13 July	3 August 2016
MB v Secretary of State for Work and Pensions	[2016] UKSC 53	5 July	10 August
R (on the application of Ingenious Media Holdings plc v Commissioners for Her Majesty's Revenue and Customs)	[2016] UKSC 54	4 July	19 October
R v Mitchell	[2016] UKSC 55	7 July	19 October
R (on the application of Johnson) v Secretary of State for the Home Department	[2016] UKSC 56	25–6 July	19 October
Impact Funding Solutions Ltd v AIG Europe Insurance Ltd (formerly known as Chartis Insurance (UK) Ltd	[2016] UKSC 57	30 June	26 October
R (on the application of Rutherford and another) v Secretary of State for Work and Pensions	[2016] UKSC 58	29 February – 2 March	9 November
Makhlouf v Secretary of State for the Home Department (Northern Ireland)	[2016] UKSC 59	12–14 January	16 November
Hesham Ali (Iraq) v Secretary of State for the Home Department	[2016] UKSC 60	12–14 January	16 November
R v Golds	[2016] UKSC 61	14 June	30 November
R v Docherty	[2016] UKSC 62	3–4 May	14 December
R (on the application of Mirza) v Secretary of State for the Home Department	[2016] UKSC 63	19 October	14 December
Habib Khan v General Pharmaceutical Council	[2016] UKSC 64	10 November	14 December
R v Guraj	[2016] UKSC 65	17 November	14 December
