= Dalloz =

Dalloz may refer to:

- The Recueil Dalloz, the most prestigious French legal journal, created in 1824 by Désiré Dalloz and his brother Armand, dedicated to short articles
- Éditions Dalloz, the publishing company created in 1845 as "Dalloz" by the Dalloz brothers from the Recueil Dalloz’s success.
- Désiré Dalloz (1795–1869), founder of the above companies
