= Case law =

Set of past rulings cited as precedent

Case law is a law that is based on precedents, that is the judicial decisions from previous cases, rather than law based on constitutions, statutes, or regulations. Case law uses the detailed facts of a legal case that have been resolved by courts or similar tribunals. These past decisions are called "case law", or precedent. Stare decisis—a Latin phrase meaning "let the decision stand"—is the principle by which judges are bound to such past decisions, drawing on established judicial authority to formulate their positions. The term is often used interchangeably with common law.

These judicial interpretations are distinguished from statutory law, which are codes enacted by legislative bodies, and regulatory law, which are established by executive agencies based on statutes. In some jurisdictions, case law can be applied to ongoing adjudication; for example, criminal proceedings or family law.

In common law countries (including the United Kingdom, United States, Canada, Australia, New Zealand, South Africa, Singapore, Ireland, India, Pakistan, Bangladesh, Sri Lanka, Nepal, Bhutan, Israel and Hong Kong), it is used for judicial decisions of selected appellate courts, courts of first instance, agency tribunals, and other bodies discharging adjudicatory functions.

== In common law systems ==
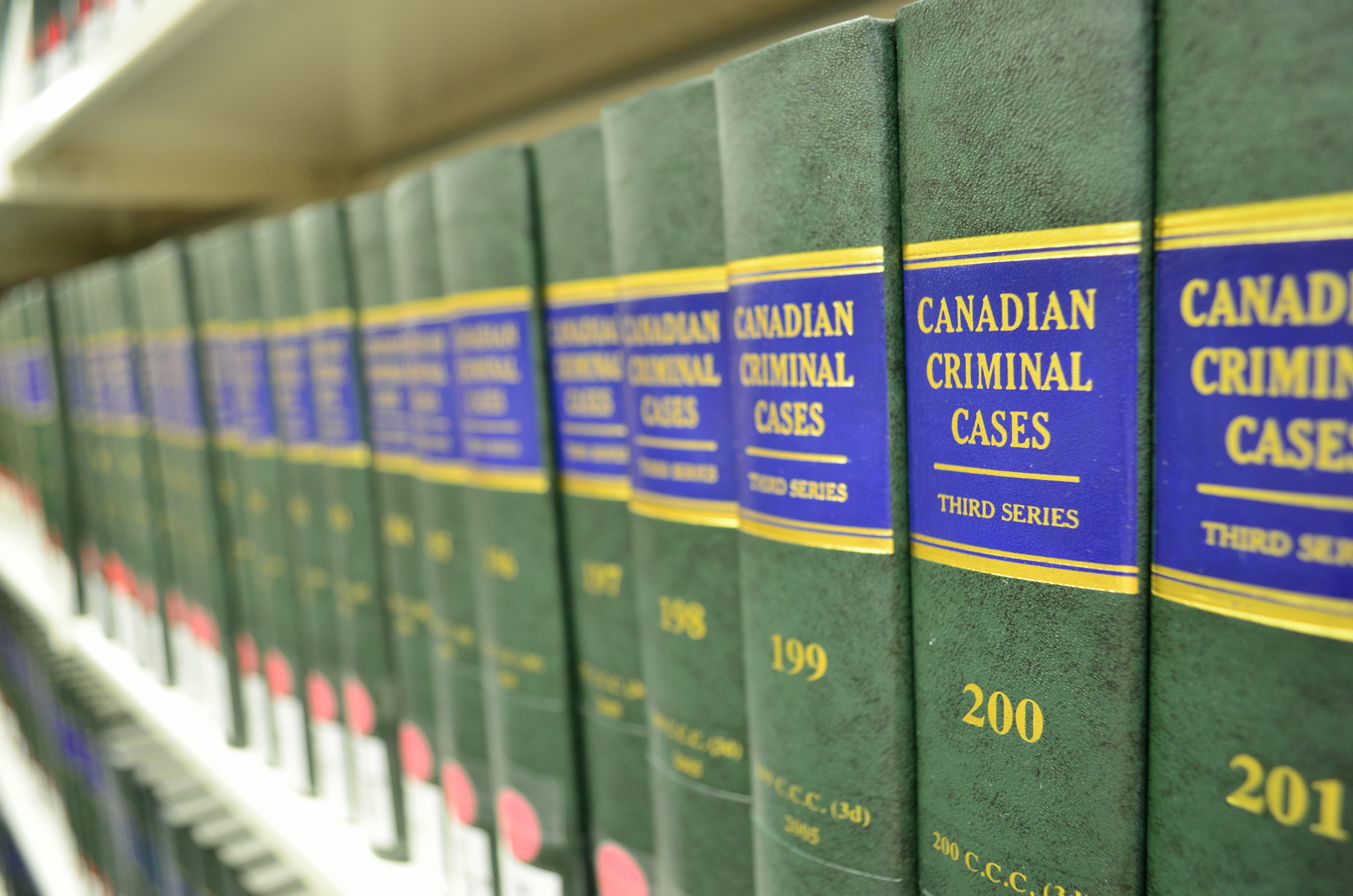
Criminal cases

In the common law tradition, courts decide the law applicable to a case by interpreting statutes and applying precedents which record how and why prior cases have been decided. Unlike most civil law systems, common law systems follow the doctrine of stare decisis, by which most courts are bound by their own previous decisions in similar cases. According to stare decisis, all lower courts should make decisions consistent with the previous decisions of higher courts. For example, in England, the High Court and the Court of Appeals are each bound by their own previous decisions, however, since the Practice Statement 1966 the Supreme Court of the United Kingdom can deviate from its earlier decisions, although in practice it rarely does. A notable example of when the court has overturned its precedent is the case of R v Jogee, where the Supreme Court of the United Kingdom ruled that it and the other courts of England and Wales had misapplied the law for nearly 30 years.

Generally speaking, higher courts do not have direct oversight over the lower courts of record, in that they cannot reach out on their initiative (sua sponte) at any time to overrule judgments of the lower courts. Normally, the burden rests with litigants to appeal rulings (including those in clear violation of established case law) to the higher courts. If a judge acts against precedent, and the case is not appealed, the decision will stand.

A lower court may not rule against a binding precedent, even if it feels that it is unjust; it may only express the hope that a higher court or the legislature will reform the rule in question. If the court believes that developments or trends in legal reasoning render the precedent unhelpful, and wishes to evade it and help the law evolve, it may either hold that the precedent is inconsistent with subsequent authority, or that it should be distinguished by some material difference between the facts of the cases; some jurisdictions allow for a judge to recommend that an appeal be carried out. If that judgment goes to appeal, the appellate court will have the opportunity to review both the precedent and the case under appeal, perhaps overruling the previous case law by setting a new precedent of higher authority. This may happen several times as the case works its way through successive appeals. Lord Denning, first of the High Court of Justice, later of the Court of Appeal, provided a famous example of this evolutionary process in his development of the concept of estoppel starting in the High Trees case.

== How case law is made ==
The different roles of case law in civil and common law traditions create differences in the way that courts render decisions. Common law courts generally explain in detail the legal rationale behind their decisions, with citations of both legislation and previous relevant judgments, and often interpret the wider legal principles. The necessary analysis (called ratio decidendi), then constitutes a precedent binding on other courts; further analyses not strictly necessary to the determination of the current case are called obiter dicta, which constitute persuasive authority but are not technically binding. By contrast, decisions in civil law jurisdictions are generally shorter, referring only to statutes.

The reason for this difference is that these civil law jurisdictions adhere to a tradition that the reader should be able to deduce the logic from the decision and the statutes.

Some pluralist systems, such as Scots law in Scotland and types of civil law jurisdictions in Quebec and Louisiana, do not precisely fit into the dual common-civil law system classifications. These types of systems may have been heavily influenced by the Anglo-American common law tradition; however, their substantive law is firmly rooted in the civil law tradition. Because of their position between the two main systems of law, these types of legal systems are sometimes referred to as mixed systems of law.

Law professors traditionally have played a much smaller role in developing case law in common law than professors in civil law. Because court decisions in civil law traditions are historically brief and not formally amenable to establishing precedent, much of the exposition of the law in civil law traditions is done by academics rather than by judges; this is called doctrine and may be published in treatises or in journals such as Recueil Dalloz in France. Historically, common law courts relied little on legal scholarship; thus, at the turn of the twentieth century, it was very rare to see an academic writer quoted in a legal decision (except perhaps for the academic writings of prominent judges such as Coke and Blackstone). Today academic writers are often cited in legal argument and decisions as persuasive authority; often, they are cited when judges are attempting to implement reasoning that other courts have not yet adopted, or when the judge believes the academic's restatement of the law is more compelling than can be found in case law. Thus common law systems are adopting one of the approaches long-held in civil law jurisdictions.

Judges may refer to various types of persuasive authority to decide a case. Widely cited non-binding sources include legal encyclopedias such as Corpus Juris Secundum and Halsbury's Laws of England, or the published work of the Law Commission or the American Law Institute. Some bodies are given statutory powers to issue guidance with persuasive authority or similar statutory effect, such as the Highway Code.

In federal or multi-jurisdictional law systems there may exist conflicts between the various lower appellate courts. Sometimes these differences may not be resolved, and it may be necessary to distinguish how the law is applied in one district, province, division or appellate department. Usually, only an appeal accepted by the court of last resort will resolve such differences and, for many reasons, such appeals are often not granted.

Any court may seek to distinguish the present case from that of a binding precedent, to reach a different conclusion. The validity of such a distinction may or may not be accepted on appeal of that judgment to a higher court. An appellate court may also decide on an entirely new and different analysis from that of junior courts, and may or may not be bound by its own previous decisions, or in any case, may distinguish them on the facts.

Where there are several members of a court deciding a case, there may be one or more judgments given (or reported). Only the reason for the decision of the majority can constitute a binding precedent, but all may be cited as persuasive, or their reasoning may be adopted in an argument. Apart from the rules of procedure for precedent, the weight given to any reported judgment may depend on the reputation of both the reporter and the judges.

== Nordic nations ==
The legal systems of the Nordic countries are sometimes included among the civil law systems, but as a separate branch, and sometimes counted as separate from the civil law tradition. In Sweden, for instance, case law arguably plays a more important role than in some of the Continental codified law systems. The two highest courts, the Supreme Court (Högsta domstolen) and the Supreme Administrative Court (Högsta förvaltningsdomstolen), have the right to set precedent which is in practice (however not formally) binding on all future application of the law. Courts of appeal, both general courts (hovrätter) and administrative courts (kammarrätter), may also issue decisions that act as guides for the application of the law, but these decisions may be overturned by higher courts. Thus case law is used to determine the actual applicability and limits of a law and not, as in common law jurisdictions, the creation of law.

== See also ==
- Judicial activism
- Judicial interpretation
- Law report
- Legal opinion
- Lists of case law
- Precedent
