= Bernio Verhagen =

Surinamese fraudster (born 1994)

- Born: Bernio Jordan Enzo Verhagen; 13 February 1994 (age 32); Paramaribo, Suriname
- Height: 1.75 m (5 ft 9 in)
- Children: 1
- Status: Incarcerated
- Convictions: Fraud, battery, robbery (Denmark); robbery (Netherlands)
- Penalty: 15 months imprisonment, deportation (Denmark); nine years imprisonment (Netherlands)
Association football career
- Position: Forward
Youth career
- 2013–2015: Willem II (amateurs
Senior career*
Years	Team	Apps	(Gls)
2015–2017	VV TSC Oosterhout		
2017	VV Oosterhout		
2018–2019	SC Den Dungen		
2019	Dinamo-Auto Tiraspol	0	(0)
2019	Cape Town City	0	(0)
2019	Audax Italiano	0	(0)
2019	Viborg FF	0	(0)
- * Club domestic league appearances and goals

Bernio Jordan Enzo Verhagen (born 13 February 1994) is a Surinamese former footballer and convicted fraudster.

Despite lacking professional experience, Verhagen signed short-lived contracts with clubs in Moldova, South Africa, Chile, and Denmark, often under false pretences involving forged endorsements. His football career ended in 2019 following a police report from Danish football club Viborg FF, which exposed his fraudulent activities. Verhagen later faced multiple criminal charges, including robbery, fraud, and assault, resulting in convictions and prison sentences in Denmark, Colombia, and the Netherlands.

== Football career ==
Verhagen briefly played in the youth of the amateurs of Dutch club Willem II (amateurs. He later claimed to have completed the full youth academy of professional club Willem II. Afterwards, he was registered in three different amateur clubs in the Netherlands: VV TSC Oosterhout, VV Oosterhout and SC Den Dungen.

In 2019, Verhagen signed a contract with Dinamo-Auto Tiraspol in the Moldovan breakaway state of Transnistria, despite only having appeared as an amateur footballer and never having earned a professional contract. Verhagen never made his debut for the club. He left Dinamo-Auto months later, and moved to South African Premier Soccer League club Cape Town City. The club had received recommendations about Verhagen by a person pretending to be the acclaimed Dutch player agent Mo Sinouh from the Stellar Group agency. Again, Verhagen was only at the club for about one month, again without making any appearances, after which he was signed by Chilean club Audax Italiano. He played no matches for Audax Italiano and was only a part of the club for about a month. He since stated that he was subjected to racism by his teammates in Chile. Audax Italiano had been told that they could resell Verhagen to an unspecified Chinese club for $2 million.

On 5 November 2019, Viborg FF presented Verhagen as their new player. Viborg's director of sports, Jesper Fredberg, described Verhagen as a "lightning fast and aggressive player who will fit in well here and can cover all three attacking positions in our tactics". Shortly afterwards, a club statement was issued which said that they had never seen him play before the contract was signed. On 26 November 2019, Viborg FF announced in a press release that the club had terminated Verhagen's contract by mutual agreement and that the club had also reported him to the police. As had happened with Cape Town City, Viborg FF had been persuaded by an agent posing as Mo Sinouh from the renowned agency Stellar Group. Furthermore, Viborg FF had been offered the prospect of selling Verhagen on to Chinese club Hebei Elite with a profit in a short time. Verhagen made no appearances for Viborg FF.

== Personal life ==
Verhagen is a Dutch citizen. He has a daughter in Denmark, but the mother has custody of the child.

=== Criminal activities ===
==== Denmark ====
Danish police have charged Verhagen with rape, robbery, forgery, fraud and fleeing from the police, after his arrival in Viborg FF in November 2019. Since 27 November 2019, Verhagen has been remanded in custody – only interrupted by a 12-hour period as a fugitive after he managed to escape from police. On 24 June 2020, Verhagen was convicted of robbery and battery, but acquitted of rape, and was sentenced to one year and three months in prison and criminal deportation from Denmark. On 18 August 2020, he pleaded guilty to fraud and forgery.

==== Colombia ====
Verhagen arrived at the city of Santa Marta, Colombia on 11 June 2021. According to police authorities, he introduced himself as a professional player for major football clubs in Europe, showing pictures where he appeared signing contracts, and with team members and wearing their jerseys. Apparently, he spent the next few nights at various luxurious hotels in the city, rented yachts, and dined in exclusive restaurants without paying for any of it, taking advantage of the owners' willingness to receive his supposed endorsement. According to the police chief of the city, Verhagen made reservations via electronic platforms and promised electronic payment due to his lack of cash. He showed electronic bills to demonstrate his payments, and when they appeared as pending he argued that they were delayed due to the fact that they were international transfers. After enjoying the services he cancelled the transactions and left.

Verhagen was finally arrested in the beach of El Rodadero on 14 June 2021, when he attempted to con a number of sexual workers whom he had hired. The women demanded he paid in cash and when he refused the women called on people to help them stop him. Verhagen was about to be lynched when the police arrived. The police arrested him after doing a background check and discovering that he was a conman, attempting similar strategies in other countries. The Kingdom of the Netherlands requested Verhagen in extradition in August 2021.

==== Netherlands ====
In December 2023, a Dutch court in Breda sentenced Verhagen to nine years in prison for two home robberies and an attempted robbery in Lieshout and Tilburg between late 2020 and early 2021. Victims were threatened with weapons, robbed of valuables, and, in one case, held captive for eight hours. The court rejected Bernio's discredited alibis and attempts to blame accomplices, citing the severity of the crimes and his prior record of violent offenses.
