= Santi Romano =

Italian lawyer and judge (1875–1947)

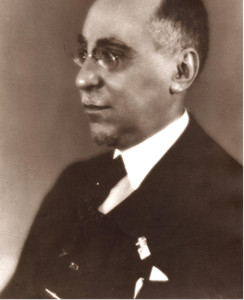
- Santi Romano in c. 1930.
- Born: 31 January 1875; Palermo, Italy
- Died: 3 November 1947 (aged 72); Rome, Italy
- Occupation: Professor
- Years active: 1898–1944
- Board member of: Italian Council of State (1928–1944); Senate of the Kingdom of Italy (1934–1945)

Academic background
- Education: University of Palermo

Academic work
- Discipline: Public law, Jurisprudence
- Institutions: Universities of Camerino, Modena, Pisa, Milano, Roma
- Notable ideas: Legal pluralism; Legal institutionalism

Santi Romano (31 January 1875 – 3 November 1947) was an Italian public lawyer. He taught administrative law, constitutional law, ecclesiastical law and international law at several Italian universities, served as President of the Council of State from 1928 to 1944, became a senator of the Kingdom in 1934, and was a member of the Lincean Academy until his dismissal in 1946.

A leading advocate of legal pluralism, he is best known for his contributions to administrative legal scholarship and for his influential book The Legal Order (1918). Together with his mentor Vittorio Emanuele Orlando, Romano is widely regarded as a foremost exponent of the Italian school of public law of his time.

The evolving nature of Romano's relationship with Fascism is debated among scholars. He joined the National Fascist Party in 1928. His role within the party and government is controversial. It has been interpreted both as active support for Fascism and, conversely, as an attempt to moderate its more extreme tendencies.

== Biography ==
=== Early life and education ===
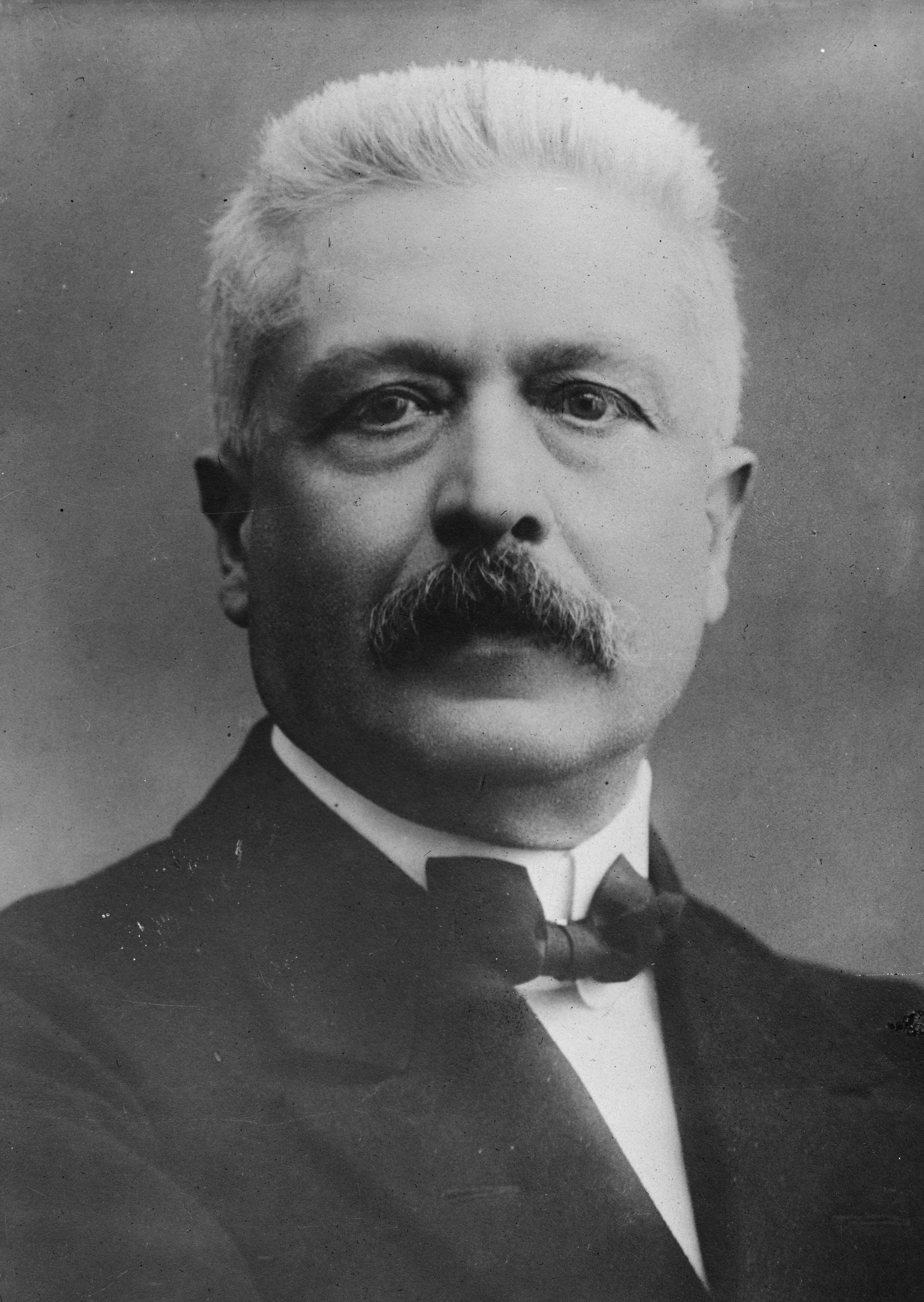
Vittorio Emanuele Orlando, the founder of the Italian School of Public Law, played a crucial role in the life and career of Santi Romano.

Santi Romano was born in Palermo on 31 January 1875. His parents were Salvatore Romano and Carmela Perez, members of an upper-middle-class family.

He enrolled at the Faculty of Law in Palermo and, while still a student, began working at the law firm of Vittorio Emanuele Orlando, an Italian legal scholar and politician who would later serve as Prime Minister. In 1891, Orlando founded the public law journal Archivio di diritto pubblico. Romano joined this journal and published his first essay in it in 1894. In 1896, he graduated under Orlando's supervision, and in 1897 he published his dissertation as a monograph on public rights in the first volume of Orlando's Primo trattato completo di diritto amministrativo italiano (First Complete Treatise of Italian Administrative Law), which was a comprehensive book series on Italian administrative law.

=== Career ===
In 1898, Romano obtained a libera docenza in administrative law and the following year, he was appointed as a non-tenured professor of constitutional law at the University of Camerino. In 1902, he moved to the University of Modena as a non-tenured professor in international law and, in 1906, he became a full tenured professor of constitutional law at Modena. In 1908, Romano moved to the University of Pisa as professor of administrative law, where in January 1909 he delivered his inaugural lecture "The Modern State and its Crisis".

In his lecture, Romano celebrated the state as a "marvelous creation of the law", argued that new social and economic organisations posed a danger when they acted autonomously from or in opposition to the state, and asserted that the state should be able to integrate corporate tendencies into a higher unity. In 1917–1918, he published the first edition of L'ordinamento giuridico (The Legal Order), his most renowned contribution to jurisprudence. In it, he set out his theory of legal institutionalism and pluralism: drawing on Otto von Gierke's and Maurice Houriou's work, he argued that law is not simply a set of rules, but an organisation or institution, and theorised the existence of autonomous legal orders beyond the state, interacting with one another. Romano cited the international community, the Church, a criminal organisation and a revolutionary party as examples of non-state legal orders, each exercising absolute authority within its own sphere.

From 1917 to 1921, Romano was a member of the High Council for Education. (Note: The High Council for Public Instruction (Consiglio Superiore della Pubblica Istruzione) was the primary technical advisory body for the Ministry of Public Instruction, established by the Casati Law in 1859. It dealt with the organisation of schools and universities and held considerable influence until the Gentile Reform. See Eandi, Carla (2025). "Storia e storie della scuola italiana. Parte terza: dalla legge Coppino del 1877 alla Riforma Gentile". www.camillocavour.com (in Italian). Associazione Amici della Fondazione Camillo Cavour. Archived from the original on 20 April 2024.) From 1923 to 1924, he served as Dean of the Law Faculty of Pisa. In 1924, he moved to the University of Milan, where he served as Dean of the Law Faculty in 1927–1928. In 1924 he was also appointed to the "Commission of the Fifteen" for constitutional reform set up by the Fascist government. In 1926 he became a member of the Council of diplomatic litigation. (Note: The Council of diplomatic litigation (Consiglio del contenzioso diplomatico) was a special advisory body established within the Ministry of Foreign Affairs. Composed of diplomats, senior bureaucrats and legal experts appointed by the King upon the proposal of the foreign minister, it was tasked with providing non-binding legal opinions on matters of international law. See Zamboni, Matteo (2017). "The Treatment of Italians Abroad in the Legal Opinions of the Consiglio del Contenzioso Diplomatico of the Italian Ministry of Foreign Affairs (1861-1907)". Giornale di storia costituzionale (in Italian). 34 (2): 177–209.) Between 1918 and 1926 he published several handbooks in constitutional law, international law, ecclesiastical law, and colonial law.

In October 1928, Romano joined the National Fascist Party and in the same year was appointed as President of the Consiglio di Stato (Council of State), the Italian administrative high court. He resigned as a professor but continued his academic teaching at the Sapienza University of Rome, where he lectured in administrative law and organisation (1929–1931) and constitutional law (1932–1942). The chair in constitutional law had previously been held by Romano's mentor, Vittorio Emanuele Orlando, who was forced to relinquish it after refusing to swear allegiance to the Fascist Party. In 1934, he was appointed to the Italian Senate. He remained in this post until 1945.

In 1938, Romano wrote a controversial legal opinion on the First Marshall of the Empire, a newly created military rank and the highest in the Italian military, which was jointly awarded to King Victor Emmanuel III and Benito Mussolini. The King considered vetoing the law that created the rank and asked for formal advice from the President of the Council of State. Romano concluded the law was not in breach of the Kingdom's constitution. Victor Emmanuel saw the law as an encroachment on the prerogatives of the Crown and resented being placed on an equal footing with the Head of Government in the military hierarchy. He protested against Romano's opinion, calling him a "pusillanimous opportunist", but eventually promulgated the law.

=== Later career and death ===
After the fall of the Fascist regime and the creation of the Italian Social Republic – a Nazi-backed puppet state in northern Italy – Romano issued provisions for the transfer of the State Council to Cremona, a city under the control of the new regime. When he was ordered to relocate there himself, he chose instead to retire.

After the Allied liberation of Rome in June 1944, he briefly reassumed his office, but in September he was summoned to appear before the High Court of Justice for sanctions against fascism as a former senator, and was also subjected to disciplinary proceedings by the Council of State's purge commission for collaborating with the government of the Italian Social Republic. Romano was suspended from service on 3 October 1944 but applied for and was granted retirement on 29 January 1945, retaining his right to a pension. He was also removed from university teaching and stripped of his position as Senator. In 1946, with the decisive vote of Benedetto Croce, Romano was dismissed from the Accademia dei Lincei.

He spent the last years of his life in solitude working on his book Frammenti di un dizionario giuridico ("Fragments of a Legal Dictionary"), a work that combines rigorous juridical investigations into legal concepts with more personal reflections, possibly influenced by his circumstances at the time. During this period, he maintained a brief correspondence with Vittorio Emanuele Orlando which, despite their different political views, testifies to a continued personal relationship.

He died in Rome on the 3 November 1947.

=== Relationship with Fascism ===
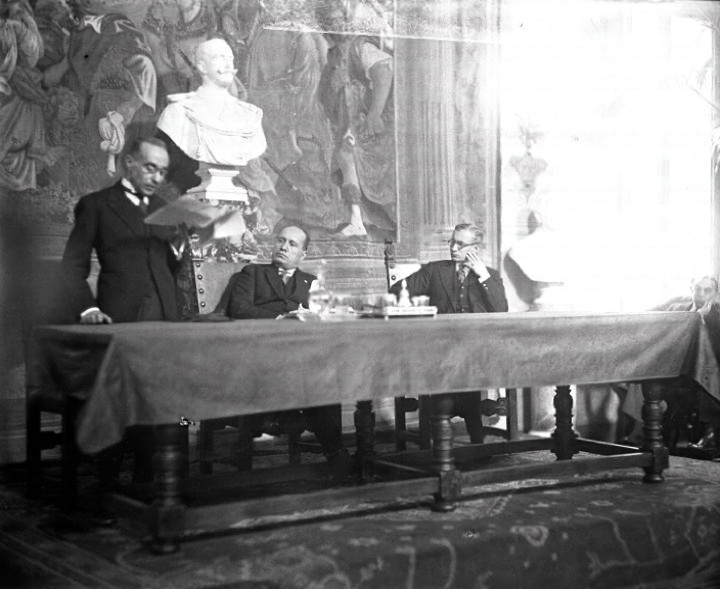
Santi Romano delivers a speech in the presence of Benito Mussolini (centre) and Michele Bianchi (right) on the occasion of his appointment as President of the Council of State, Rome, 20 December 1928.

Romano's relationship with Fascism has been the subject of differing interpretations among scholars. Aldo Sandulli described his political and philosophical views as conservative, anti-individualist and opposed to the Enlightenment – typical of the agrarian bourgeoisie of southern Italy. He speculates that Romano, like other liberal-era jurists, may have hoped that the Fascist regime could remedy the perceived "crisis of the state" – marked by strikes and widespread political and social conflict – while upholding the basic principles of liberalism. According to Norberto Bobbio, Romano was "theoretically pluralist but ideologically monist" because of his defence of state authority, particularly against trade unionism and socialism.

Soon after the fascist regime came to power in 1922, Romano began serving as an advisor to the regime, particularly on matters of constitutional reform. Scholars note that he joined the National Fascist Party rather late, in October 1928, a few months before taking up the post of President of the Consiglio di Stato, Italy's highest administrative court. His appointment, initiated directly by Benito Mussolini, was unprecedented: it was the only time in the Court's history that an academic with no previous experience as a state councillor was chosen for the post.

Scholars disagree on the significance of his party membership and appointment. Some see it as a means by which the regime sought to align the Council of State with Fascist doctrine, while others see it as an attempt by the regime to co-opt influential figures from the establishment. There is also disagreement over whether Romano's adherence to fascism should be understood as a voluntary and deeply held commitment, or rather as a form of technical collaboration aimed at countering the regime's more radical tendencies.

Scholars note that Romano's later writings increasingly emphasised the theme of state sovereignty, downplaying the pluralist ideas that had previously characterised his legal thought and reflecting a shift towards positions closer to Fascist ideology. Some argue that he managed to maintain a degree of independence in both thought and practice: Guido Melis suggested that his "discreet role" during the regime was to provide "legal expertise on behalf of the government", while others maintained that he carried out his judicial duties with integrity. Under his leadership, the Council of State was not fully fascistised, which, according to Melis, suggests that Romano sought to preserve some autonomy for the administrative judiciary amid political pressure from the dictatorship.

Romano accepted an invitation to join the scientific committee of the antisemitic law journal Il diritto razzista ("Racist Law"), which was founded in 1939.

=== Family life ===
In 1911, Santi Romano married Silvia Faraone, with whom he had two children: Salvatore (born in Modena in 1904, who became professor in private law at the University of Florence) and Silvio (born in Modena in 1907, who became professor of Institutions of Roman Law at the University of Turin).

== Doctrine ==
According to Romano, the law, before being a system of rules, is "an organization, a structure", an entity or social body that is organised, stable and relatively autonomous from other organisations. He calls this entity an "institution", which he identifies with the legal order. For Romano, every institution constitutes a legal order, since ubi societas ibi ius ("where there is society, there is law"). He argues that any legal order can be relevant to any other to any degree, as well as completely irrelevant. Certain legal orders may be internal to others; for example, both the state and the international community are, according to Romano, "institutions of institutions" – legal orders composed of other orders.

Alongside the state and the international community, Romano focused on the proliferation of self-regulating legal orders, which he called "unequivocal signs of a social pluralism typical of the dynamic society of the early 20th century". Scholars note that Romano, like his French contemporary Maurice Hauriou, was concerned with the development of organised societal structures such as mass political parties and trade unions, whose normativity depends on their independent capacity to obtain allegiance rather than on state recognition. Since legal orders can emerge spontaneously to enable the pursuit of certain goals, Romano did not deem sanctions essential to the existence of a legal order; in his view, they can be replaced by other effective means of social pressure.

According to Romano, the plurality of legal orders and their internal normativity are relevant for legal scholars: given "the unquestionable importance [that Romano attributes] to the unwritten sources of the legal order", legal scholars cannot limit themselves to interpreting statutes, but must also consider the actual functioning of legal orders – their constitutive principles, practices and practical necessities. He argues that beyond the content of legal rules, scholars must analyse and expose what happens in practice: the "boundless horizon ... of the entire social life".

However, scholars note that Romano did not embrace sociological jurisprudence and remained a faithful pupil of his mentor Vittorio Emanuele Orlando, who was the first academic in Italy to insist on the need to separate law and politics, and to adopt a strictly legal method in the study of public law. Romano urged jurists to avoid "any contamination of the 'juristic point of view' with non‐legal concepts and methods" and "availed himself of the tools of legal dogmatics".

== Legacy ==
Santi Romano is regarded as an important exponent of legal institutionalism and pluralism in the legal culture of his time. Both doctrines were theorised in The Legal Order (1917–1918), which has been translated into Spanish (1963), French (1975), German (1975), Portuguese (2008) and English (2017), and has been described as "the most important Italian legal work of the 20th century". According to Roger Cotterrell, The Legal Order is "an extremely rare pioneer work, almost unique (especially as a book by a lawyer) in arguing that a radical, pervasive legal pluralism is a general feature of modern societies", and it did so "many decades before legal pluralism began to become a familiar term in social scientific studies of law". Romano has also contributed significantly to the fields of constitutional and administrative law. According to Aldo Sandulli, Romano was "a complex and prismatic figure", who deserves to be celebrated – despite his complicity with Fascism – as "the major Italian scholar of Public Law and, maybe, the major jurist our country has ever produced".

Shortly after the Nazis came to power, Carl Schmitt, a prominent German public lawyer and critic of legal positivism, embraced Romano's institutionalist theory, as he acknowledged in his essay On the Three Types of Juristic Thought (1934). However, scholars note that Schmitt's reception of Romano was selective: unlike Romano, who viewed society as comprising multiple, sometimes competing legal orders, Schmitt conceived of this plurality as subordinate to the state; by asserting the state's authority over non-state legal orders, Schmitt implicitly rejected Romano's legal pluralism.

Santi Romano died in 1947, isolated and stripped of all his institutional posts. As an unrepentant follower of Mussolini and Fascism, he was subjected to a "purge trial". In contrast, his former maestro, Vittorio Emanuele Orlando, had reformed and deviated from fascism and became, at the age of 85, president of the first session of the Constituent Assembly in 1946.

Among Santi Romano's academic pupils are Guido Zanobini, Giovanni Miele, Massimo Severo Giannini and Paolo Biscaretti di Ruffia.

== Honours and awards ==
Apart from his roles as President of the Council of State (15 December 1928 – 11 October 1944), Senator of the Kingdom of Italy (16 May 1935 – 4 January 1946), and member of the Accademia dei Lincei (16 May 1935 – 4 January 1946), Santi Romano received the following honors and awards:

- Correspondent member of the Academy of Sciences of Turin (1922)
- Member of the Consiglio superiore della pubblica istruzione [High Council for Education] and its Board (1917–1921)
- Member of the Presidential Commission for Constitutional Reforms (1925)
- Member of the Higher Council of National Education
- Member of the Diplomatic Litigation Council
- Correspondent member of the Accademia di scienze, lettere ed arti of Palermo
- Correspondent member of the Accademia di scienze, lettere ed arti of Modena
- Knight of the Order of the Crown of Italy (1911)
- Officer of the Order of the Crown of Italy (1917)
- Commander of the Order of the Crown of Italy (1921)
- Grand Officer of the Order of the Crown of Italy (1926)
- Knight Grand Cross of the Order of the Crown of Italy (1930)
- Knight of the Order of Saints Maurice and Lazarus (1916)
- Officer of the Order of Saints Maurice and Lazarus (1921)
- Grand Officer of the Order of Saints Maurice and Lazarus (1932)
- Knight Grand Cross of the Order of Saints Maurice and Lazarus (1933)

== Publications (selected) ==
=== In English ===
- Romano, Santi (2017). Croce, Mariano (ed.). Legal Order. Routledge. ISBN 9780367180805. OCLC 1057785097.

=== In Italian (in chronological order) ===
- "La teoria dei diritti pubblici subiettivi", in V. Orlando (ed.), Primo Trattato completo di diritto amministrativo italiano, Vol. 1, Milano, 1897 read online Archived 31 January 2024 at the Wayback Machine
- Principii di diritto amministrativo italiano, Milano, Società Editrice Libraria, 1901 (3rd ed. 1912). read online Archived 19 February 2024 at the Wayback Machine
- "L'instaurazione di fatto di un ordinamento costituzionale e la sua legittimazione", in Archivio giuridico, Modena, 1901 (now in Scritti minori, vol. 1, Milano, Giuffrè, 1950) read online
- "Lo Stato moderno e la sua crisi", in Rivista di diritto pubblico, 1910 (now in S. Romano, Scritti minori, Vol.1). read online Archived 31 January 2024 at the Wayback Machine
- Lezioni di diritto ecclesiastico, edited by V. Mungioli, Pisa, Società editrice universitaria, 1912.
- L'ordinamento giuridico, in "Annali delle Università toscane", 1917-1918 (republished in Pisa by Mariotti in 1918; 2nd edition with added footnotes published in Firenze by Sansoni, 1946). read online Archived 7 April 2023 at the Wayback Machine
- "Oltre lo Stato", in Rivista di diritto pubblico, 1918 (now in S. Romano, Scritti minori, Vol.1). read online Archived 31 January 2024 at the Wayback Machine
- Corso di diritto coloniale, Roma 1918.
- Lezioni di diritto ecclesiastico, edited by N. Jager, Pisa-Palermo, 1923.
- Corso di diritto costituzionale, Padova, Cedam, 1926 (8th ed. 1943). read online Archived 31 January 2024 at the Wayback Machine
- Corso di diritto internazionale, Padova, Cedam, 1926 (4th ed. 1939). read online Archived 19 February 2024 at the Wayback Machine
- Corso di diritto amministrativo: Principi generali, Padova, Cedam, 1930 (3rd ed. 1937). read online Archived 31 January 2024 at the Wayback Machine
- Prolusioni e discorsi accademici, Università degli Studi di Modena, 1931. read online
- Principii di diritto costituzionale generale, Milano, Giuffrè, 1946. read online
- Frammenti di un dizionario giuridico, Milano, Giuffrè, 1947. read online
- Scritti minori, 2 volumes, Milano, Giuffrè, 1950 (2nd ed. 1990).
- Lo Stato moderno e la sua crisi. Saggi di diritto costituzionale, Milano, Giuffrè, 1969. read online
- Il diritto pubblico italiano, Milano, Giuffrè, 1988.
- Gli scritti nel Trattato Orlando, Milano, Giuffrè, 2003. read online Archived 31 January 2024 at the Wayback Machine
- L'"ultimo" Santi Romano, Milano, Giuffrè, 2013.

=== In German ===
- Italienisches Staatsrecht, Milano: Giuffrè, 1988.
- Die Rechtsordnung, Berlin: Duncker & Humblot, 1975.

=== In French ===
- L'ordre juridique, Paris: Dalloz, 1975.

=== Writings in Honour ===
- Scritti giuridici in onore di Santi Romano, 4 volumes, Padova: Cedam, 1940.

== See also ==
- A Theory of Legal Order
- Council of State (Italy)
- Legal pluralism
- Power (social and political)
- Rational-legal authority
- Vittorio Emanuele Orlando
