= Felicity Gerry =

Australian barrister

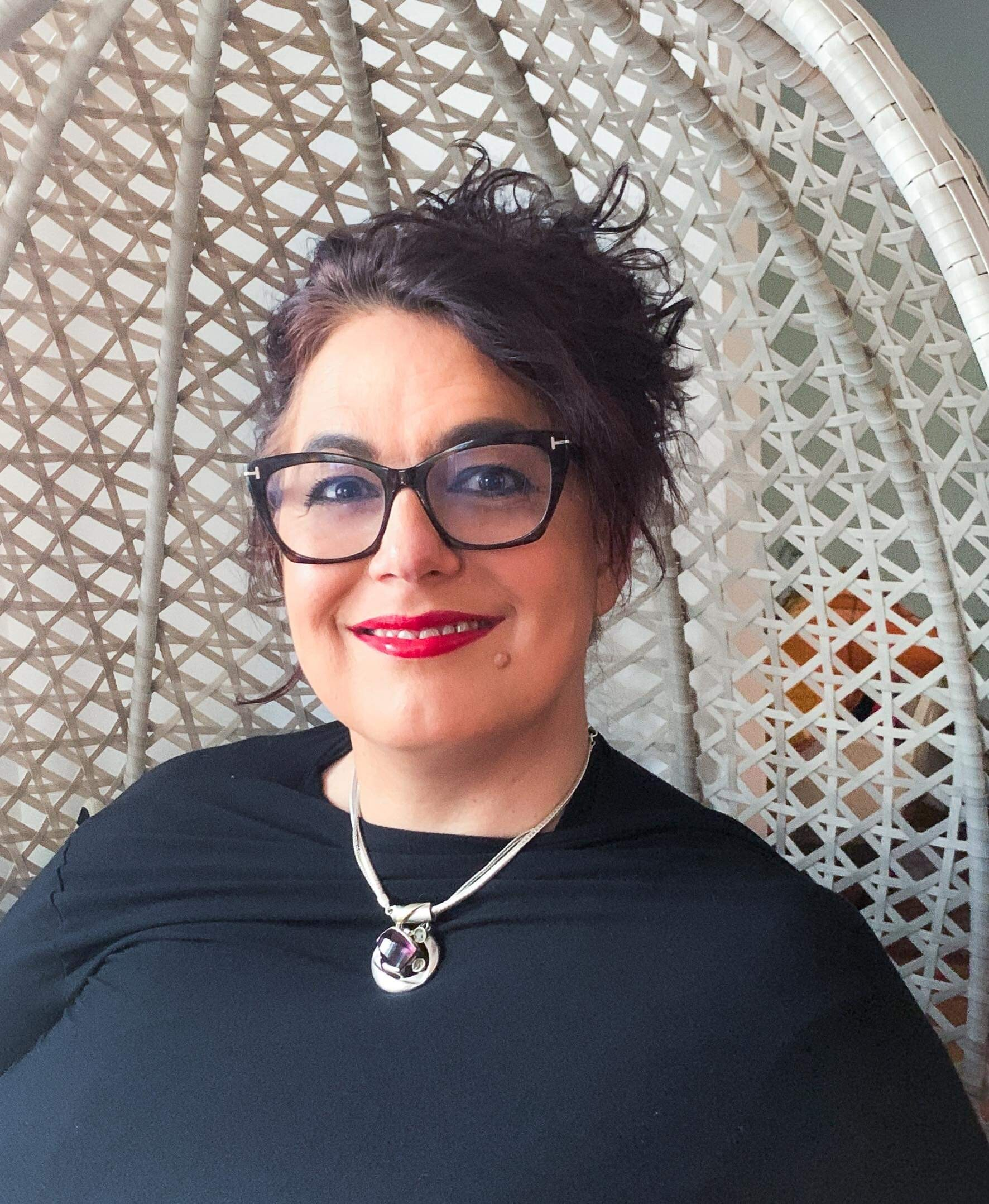

Felicity Gerry is an Australian barrister, academic, and media commentator. She is a professor of Legal Practice at Deakin University and practices at Libertas Chambers in London and Crockett Chambers in Melbourne.

== Education ==
Gerry studied undergraduate law at the University of Kingston Upon Thames, earning a Bachelor of Laws (Honours) degree. She attained postgraduate qualification as a barrister at the Inns of Court School of Law, London (Middle Temple) in 1994. She later went onto complete her Masters of Law (LLM) and PhD at Charles Darwin University.

== Career ==
Gerry has appeared in the UK Supreme Court on joint enterprise law and the Australian High Court on rights to second appeal. She contributed to the International Bar Association's report on human trafficking, and is a senior anti-human trafficking consultant for Lawyers Without Borders. She has conducted research and handled cases involving human trafficking and modern slavery. In 2015, she assisted in reprieving human trafficking survivor Mary Jane Veloso from execution in Indonesia.

She co-wrote a legal memorandum on due diligence and compliance issues under international law (including modern slavery considerations) regarding the Singapore stock exchange listed Golden City scheme in Myanmar. This memo led to divestment from the scheme.

She is a professor of Legal Practice at Deakin University, where she teaches courses on contemporary international legal challenges, including sanctions law, war crimes, modern slavery, and digital law. Gerry has also been appointed Honorary Professor at the University of Salford.

She is a commentator on international legal issues, particularly relating to international crimes, terrorism, and human rights abuses. She has appeared in a number of documentaries and news stories, including BAFTA nominated, The Cruel Cut, the Foreign Correspondent produced, Mary Jane: The woman who escaped a firing squad, the Logie Award nominated, The Queen & Zak Grieve, and BBC Three's Sex on the Edge. She is also the Editor-in-Chief of ANZSIL Perspective.

=== Key cases ===
- Gerry led the appeal before the UK Supreme Court in R v Jogee, in which the court held that the law on joint enterprise had been wrong for three decades.
- Co-counsel for Al Hassan at the International Criminal Court.
- Lead counsel for the Bahtijari defence team at the Kosovo Specialist Chambers.
- Led the defence for an accused 'Federation Square bomb plot' at the Supreme Court of Victoria and for a 'terrorist acts' case associated with a fire at a mosque in a Melbourne suburb in 2016.
- Led the team that obtained the first successful petition for mercy in the Northern Territory for young Indigenous man Zak Grieve.
- Led the intervention for Justice on the law on 'subjecthood' in the Shamima Begum appeals.
- Led the submission for reparations for historic slavery in the Cook Islands for Cook Islands lawyer Michelle Tangimama.

=== Law reform ===
In 2014 Gerry was part of the Bar Human Rights Committee of England and Wales team drafting a report to the Parliamentary Inquiry into Female Genital Mutilation ('FGM'), which contributed to legislative change on FGM law in the United Kingdom. She is the co-author of the Sexual Offences Handbook: Law, Practice and Procedure, published by Wildy, Simmonds and Hill Publishing in the United Kingdom and has written two reports for LexisNexis on women in prison.

She is also leading the campaign for posthumous exoneration of Christine Keeler, who was jailed for nine months in 1963 for a perjury, associated with the Profumo scandal.

In addition to her work in R v Jogee, she has contributed research and advocacy to changing the law on joint enterprise in the United Kingdom, and was a co-drafter of the Joint Enterprise (Significant Contribution) Bill tabled in UK Parliament by Kim Johnson MP in 2023.
