= Re N (Children) =

- Court: Supreme Court of the United Kingdom
- Full case name: In the matter of N (Children)
- Argued: 17 March 2016
- Decided: 13 April 2016
- Neutral citation: [2016] UKSC 15

Case history
- Prior history: [2015] EWCA Civ 1112

Holding
- Article 15 of Brussels II is not simply a question of which jurisdiction represents the most appropriate forum for a case but should also take into account what is in the best interests of the child.

Case opinions
- Majority: Lord Neuberger, Lady Hale, Lord Kerr, Lord Wilson and Lord Carnwath

Area of law
- Brussels II; English family law

In the matter of N (Children) [2016] UKSC 15 was a 2016 judgment of the Supreme Court of the United Kingdom that considered the relevant jurisdiction for deciding the future welfare of two young girls.

== Facts ==
The parents in the case are both from Hungary and moved to the England in 2011. The mother gave birth to two girls in 2012 and 2013. Due to the extremely poor living conditions of the family the girls were removed and have since been living with foster carers. Care proceedings commenced in January 2014 and involved communication with the Hungarian Central Authority. Later in 2014 the mother moved back to Hungary and applied for the care proceedings to be transferred to Hungary on the basis of article 15 of Brussels II which allows for the transfer of proceedings to a court in another member state that is "better placed to hear the case".

== Judgment ==
=== High Court ===
The High Court held that the Hungarian court was better placed to hear the case and asked that they accept the request for a transfer of the case.

=== Court of Appeal ===
The Court of Appeal dismissed the appeal brought by the Children's Guardian and the local authority.

=== Supreme Court ===
The Supreme Court unanimously allowed the appeal brought by the Children's Guardian. Lady Hale gave the only judgment and noted that the 'best interests' test in article 15 of Brussels II is not limited to questions regarding the choice of forum. The test also exists as an additional safeguard for the child in conjunction with article 24 of the Charter of Fundamental Rights of the European Union.

It was decided that the English courts were in as good a position as the Hungarian courts to decide the case and therefore the transfer was not necessary. Furthermore, the English courts had already heard evidence from the relevant parties and were therefore in a better position to make a judgment.

== See also ==
- English family law
- Brussels II
- Jurisdiction
