= Re B (A Child) =

- Court: Supreme Court of the United Kingdom
- Full case name: In the matter of B (A child)
- Argued: 8–9 December 2015
- Decided: 3 February 2016
- Neutral citation: [2016] UKSC 4

Case history
- Prior history: [2015] EWCA Civ 886
- Related action: In re J (A Minor) (Abduction: Custody Rights) [1990] 2 AC 562

Holding
- A child will only cease to have any habitual residence in extraordinary circumstances. Habitual residence is only lost when a sufficient degree of disengagement from the original environment has been lost.

Case opinions
- Majority: Lady Hale, Lord Wilson and Lord Toulson
- Dissent: Lord Clarke and Lord Sumption

Area of law
- Habitual residence; Jurisdiction; Children Act 1989

Re B (A Child) or In the matter of B (A child) [2016] UKSC 4 was a 2016 judgment of the Supreme Court of the United Kingdom concerning the habitual residence of a child under English law.

== Facts ==
In 2004 the appellant and respondent began a same-sex relationship but at no point entered into a civil partnership. In 2008, following a course of intrauterine insemination the respondent gave birth to a baby girl (known throughout the case as 'B'). The respondent undertook most of the care for B but the appellant effectively acted as a co-parent to the child and helped to share the responsibilities. In 2011 the relationship broke down acrimoniously and the appellant left the family home. As the respondent gradually reduced the appellant's contact with B, she secretly made plans to move with B to Pakistan. This move took place on 3 February 2014 but the appellant did not find out until after she had made an application under the Children Act 1989 for shared residence or contact with B on 13 February 2014. This application was dependent on whether B was habitually resident on the day that the application was made and this was the issue before the court.

== Judgment ==
=== High Court ===
In the High Court, Mrs Justice Hogg found that B had lost her habitual residence in England as soon as the respondent took her to Pakistan on 3 February 2014.

=== Court of Appeal ===
In August 2015 the Court of Appeal held that Mrs Justice Hogg had "applied the proper principles to the relevant facts" and accordingly dismissed the appellant's appeal.

=== Supreme Court ===
In the lead judgment, Lord Wilson held that the relevant question to be asked in this case was whether, on the date that the application was made (13 February 2014), "B had by then achieved the requisite degree of disengagement from her English environment; and highly relevant to the answer will be whether she had by then achieved the requisite degree of integration in the environment of Pakistan." Lord Wilson, alongside Lady Hale and Lord Toulson, concluded that there had not been the requisite degree of disengagement by 13 February 2014 and therefore B retained habitual residence in England. As a result of this conclusion the question regarding jurisdiction was moot.

Lord Sumption gave a dissenting judgment with which Lord Clarke agreed. He pointed out that "while the test for what constitutes habitual residence is a question of law, whether it is satisfied is a question of fact."

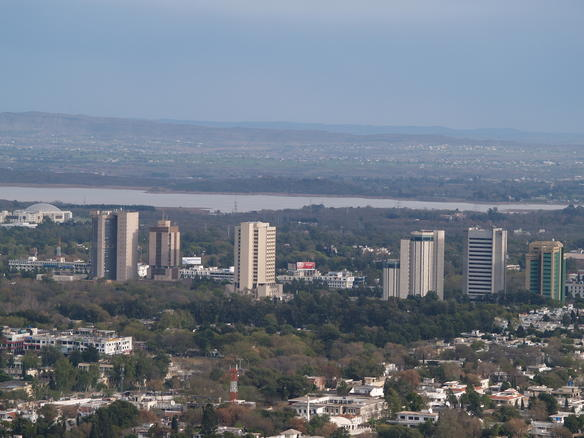
The respondent legally took B to live with her in Islamabad.

In this regard Mrs Justice Hogg heard the evidence of both sides, applied the relevant law and therefore it is not for the Supreme Court to intervene.

The judgment of the majority on the habitual residence issue meant that it was unnecessary to decide whether the inherent jurisdiction could be exercised although the judges did take the opportunity to offer dicta on the issue. Lady Hale and Lord Toulson would have exercised jurisdiction in this case; Lord Sumption and Lord Clarke would not have done; and Lord Wilson left the question open.

== Significance ==
The lawyer who represented the Reunite International Child Abduction Centre in the case responded to the judgment by saying “This judgment is of huge practical significance – and is a remarkably humane and modern judgment. The court has sent out a message that a parent with sole legal rights will no longer succeed in avoiding proceedings by abducting a child.”

== See also ==
- Habitual residence
- English family law
- 2016 Judgments of the Supreme Court of the United Kingdom
- Children Act 1989
