= First marshal of the empire =

Former Italian military rank

First Marshal of the Empire Primo Maresciallo dell'Impero
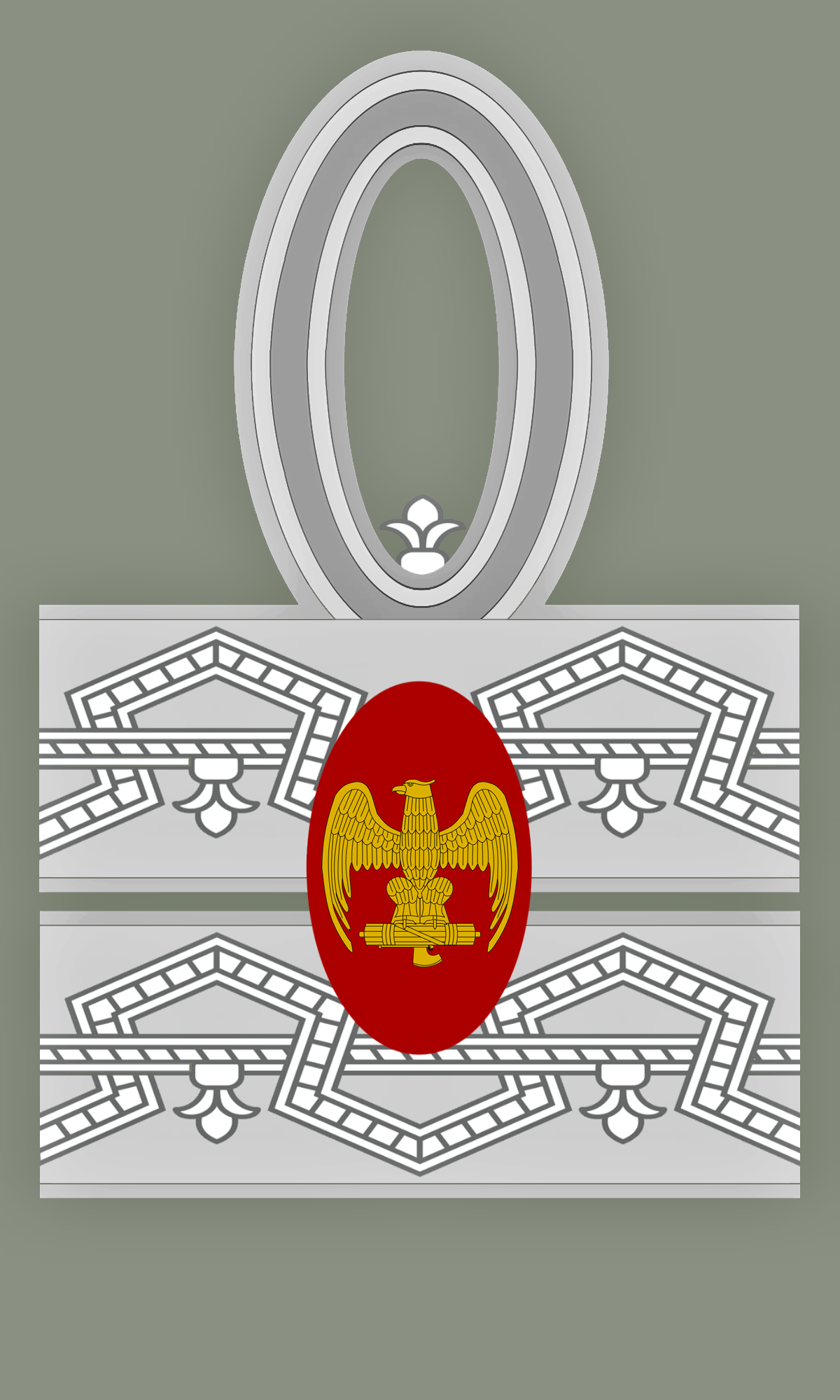
- Sleeve insignia
- Country: Kingdom of Italy; Italian Social Republic
- Formation: 2 April 1938
- Abolished: 2 June 1946
- Next lower rank: Marshal of Italy

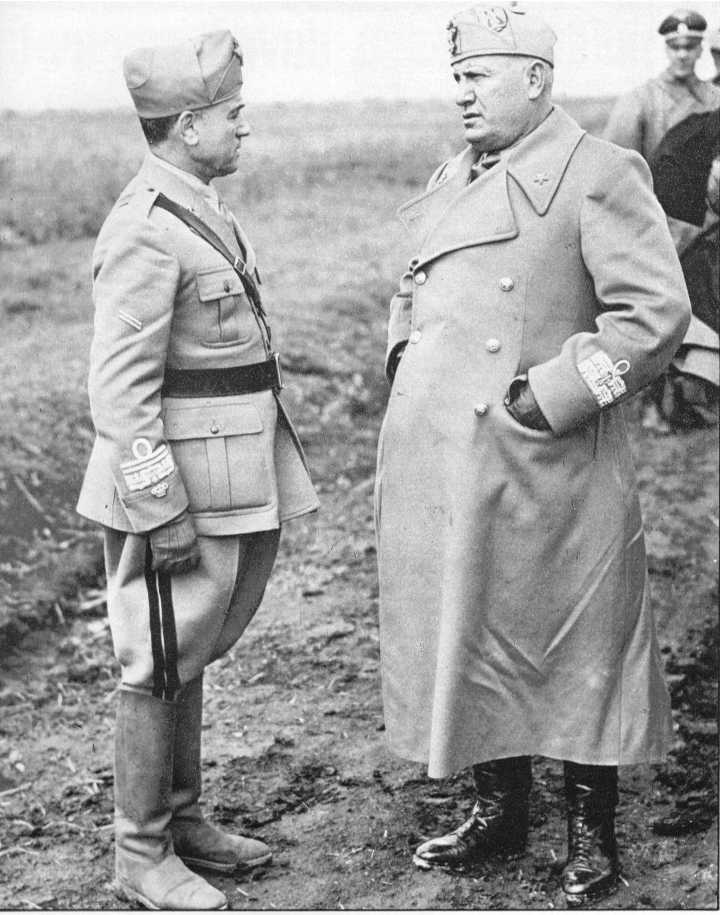
Mussolini (right) in 1941; his "First Marshal of the Empire" insignia is visible at the end of his sleeve.

First Marshal of the Empire (Italian: Primo Maresciallo dell'Impero) was a military rank established by the Italian Parliament on March 30, 1938. The highest rank in the Italian military, it was only granted to King Victor Emmanuel III and Duce Benito Mussolini.

== Creation ==
Mussolini's decision to create for himself and the King a new military rank created a crisis between himself and Victor Emmanuel III. For the first time in the history of the House of Savoy, the Prime Minister of Italy bore a rank equal with that of the head of the royal house. This gave Mussolini a mortgage on the high command of the Italian military, a power of the King under the provisions of the Albertine Statute. The King considered vetoing the law that created such rank and requested to be advised by Professor Santi Romano, President of the Council of State, who analyzed the law and found it to comply with the Statute; Victor Emmanuel vehemently protested against Romano's opinion, calling him "a pusillanimous opportunist whose job is to find arguments to justify the most absurd theses", but eventually signed the law and had it promulgated on the Gazzetta Ufficiale.

== Suppression ==
The title became obsolete with the fall of the Fascist regime in 1943 and was implicitly abrogated by the subsequent abolition of the monarchy in 1946 and the entry into force of the Italian Constitution in 1948.

The law establishing it was formally abolished on 22 December 2008 by the Fourth Berlusconi Cabinet.

== See also ==
- Marshal (Italy)
- Marshal of Italy
- Comandante Generale of Italian Blackshirts

== Sources ==
- Montanelli, Cervi Storia d'Italia 1935/1943
