= Hayward v Zurich Insurance Company plc =

- Court: Supreme Court of the United Kingdom
- Full case name: Hayward v Zurich Insurance Company plc
- Argued: 16 June 2016
- Decided: 27 July 2016
- Neutral citation: [2016] UKSC 48

Case history
- Prior history: Hayward v Zurich Insurance Company plc [2015] EWCA Civ 327

Holding
- When setting aside a compromise, the defrauded representee does not have to prove that they settled a case because they believed the misrepresentation was true.

Case opinions
- Majority: Lord Neuberger (President), Lady Hale (Deputy President), Lord Clarke, Lord Reed, Lord Toulson

Area of law
- Deceit

Hayward v Zurich Insurance Company plc [2016] UKSC 48 was a 2016 judgment of the Supreme Court of the United Kingdom that allowed an insurer to set aside a settlement agreement because of fraudulent misrepresentation by the claimant even when the insurer had misgivings about the claim prior to settling.

== Facts ==
In June 1998 Hayward (the respondent) suffered an injury at work and brought proceedings against the employer. He exaggerated the extent of his injuries in order to achieve a much higher settlement figure of £134,973.11 from Zurich Insurance Company plc (the appellant) who were the employer's insurer. When the claim was settled in October 2003 the appellant did have video evidence of the exaggerated injury but it was only in February 2009 that they had further evidence to demonstrate that Hayward had, in fact, recovered from his injuries a year prior to the original settlement. On this basis the insurer sought to set aside the settlement and also claim damages for deceit.

== Judgment ==
=== Summary Judgment ===
In the first instance Hayward applied for summary judgment on the basis that the insurer's claim had been compromised by the earlier proceedings. This argument was successful in the County Court but failed in the Court of Appeal allowing the main claim to proceed.

Zurich Insurance Company plc had doubts about Hayward's insurance claim at the time of the settlement.

=== Court of Appeal ===
The Court of Appeal found in favour of Hayward and held that the settlement could not be set aside as the insurer was aware of the deceit at the time when the settlement was agreed.

=== Supreme Court ===
The Supreme Court held that while the insurer's belief as to the deceit when reaching the settlement is a relevant factor this is not decisive as regards the inducement. At paragraph [40] it was stated "Qualified belief or disbelief does not rule out inducement, particularly where those investigations were never going to find out the evidence that subsequently came to light." The appeal was allowed, the original settlement was set aside and Hayward would instead be paid a reduced sum of £14,720.

== Reaction ==
Warren Koshofer stated that this case shows that "fraud trumps the public policy arguments of finality and encouragement of settlements."

== See also ==
- Deceit
- 2016 Judgments of the Supreme Court of the United Kingdom
- Zurich Insurance Group
- Rosa Lee, Proof of inducement in the law on misrepresentation: Hayward v Zurich, Lloyd's Maritime and Commercial Law Quarterly
