= Hague Divorce Convention =

1970 multilateral treaty

Hague Convention on the Recognition of Divorces and Legal Separations
- Parties that ratified Parties that acceded (only valid after acceptance of other countries)
- Signed: 1 June 1970
- Location: The Hague, The Netherlands
- Effective: 24 August 1975
- Condition: Ratification by 3 states
- Parties: 20
- Depositary: Ministry of Foreign Affairs (Netherlands)
- Languages: English and French

The Hague Divorce Convention, officially Convention on the Recognition of Divorces and Legal Separations is a convention concluded by the Hague Conference on Private International Law (HCCH). It regulates the recognition of divorces and legal separations provided they have been performed according to the correct legal process in the state where the divorce was obtained. Not all divorces need to be recognized under the convention. Only those divorces obtained in a state where (at the time of the start of the proceedings);

- the "respondent" (the person against whom proceedings were started) had its residence
- the "petitioner" (the person starting the procedures) had his residence (for at least a year; or: together with his/her spouse)
- corresponds to the nationality of both spouses
- corresponds to the nationality of the petitioner and where he lived, or had lived for 1 year in the past 2 years
- corresponds to the nationality of the petitioner, and where he is present, while the last state of their joint residence does not provide for divorce

== Parties ==
As of March 2013, 20 states were parties to the convention. The parties are all in Europe, except Australia, Egypt and Hong Kong. The convention is open to all countries. Countries that signed the convention, became a Party by subsequent ratification. Other countries can accede to the convention. When a country ratifies, it automatically becomes applicable between all countries that are party to the convention, whereas the accession only becomes applicable when the other country accepts that accession. Regarding members of the European Union (except Denmark), the Brussels II regulation (which handles conflict of law regarding divorce and parental responsibility) supersedes the convention. The UK government has stated that in the event of withdrawal from the European Union in March 2019 without a treaty, the UK would continue to use the Hague Divorce Convention to recognise overseas divorces.

Country	Signature	Ratification/Accession	Remarks
Albania		7 March 2013	
Australia		24 November 1985	Australian States and mainland Territories and Norfolk Islands
China		21 May 1975	Only with respect to Hong Kong
Cyprus		13 January 1983	
Czech Republic		28 June 1993	succession from Czechoslovakia
Denmark	5 December 1972	25 June 1975	
Egypt	8 May 1979	21 April 1980	
Estonia		7 November 2002	
Finland	19 November 1974	16 June 1977	
Italy	19 February 1986	19 February 1986	
Luxembourg	6 November 1981	13 February 1991	
Moldova	10 October 2011	10 October 2011	
Netherlands	23 August 1979	23 June 1981	European territory and Aruba (since 28 May 1986)
Norway	12 October 1972	15 August 1978	
Poland		25 April 1996	
Portugal	10 May 1985	10 May 1985	
Slovakia		15 March 1993	succession from Czechoslovakia
Sweden	13 September 1974	25 June 1975	
Switzerland	23 June 1975	18 May 1976	
United Kingdom	1 June 1970	21 May 1974	Extended to Bermuda (20 August 1972), Gibraltar (28 January 1977), Guernsey, Jersey, Isle of Man (21 May 1974)
