= The Mayor's Office for Policing and Crime v Mitsui Sumitomo Insurance Co (Europe) Ltd =

UK legal case

- Court: Supreme Court of the United Kingdom
- Full case name: The Mayor's Office for Policing and Crime v Mitsui Sumitomo Insurance Co (Europe) Ltd & Ors
- Argued: 27–29 October 2015
- Decided: 20 April 2016
- Neutral citation: [2016] UKSC 18
- Reported at: [2016] WLR(D) 208 [2016] 2 WLR 1148

Case history
- Prior history: APPEAL from Mitsui Sumitomo Insurance Co (Europe) Ltd v Mayor's Office for Policing and Crime [2014] EWCA Civ 682 (20 May 2014), dismissing an appeal and allowing the claimants' cross-appeals from Mitsui Sumitomo Insurance Co (Europe) Ltd & Anor v The Mayor's Office for Policing and Crime [2013] EWHC 2734 (Comm) (12 September 2013)

Holding
- Section 2 of the Riot (Damages) Act 1886 does not extend to include compensation for consequential damages.

Case opinions
- Majority: Lord Neuberger, Lord Clarke, Lord Hughes, Lord Toulson and Lord Hodge

Area of law
- Riot (Damages) Act 1886; Consequential damages

The Mayor's Office for Policing and Crime v Mitsui Sumitomo Insurance Co (Europe) Ltd [2016] UKSC 18 is a 2016 judgment of the Supreme Court of the United Kingdom that provided an interpretation of section 2 to the Riot (Damages) Act 1886.

== Facts ==
The case concerns an incident that took place during the 2011 England riots. On 8 August 2011 a gang broke into a warehouse owned by Sony DADC in Enfield. After stealing goods from the warehouse they proceeded to start a fire that destroyed the warehouse and the goods that remained inside.

The insurers, Mitsui Sumitomo Insurance Group, made a claim under section 2 of the Riot (Damages) Act 1886 but a dispute arose surrounding the quantification of loss. The MOPC argued that compensation should only extend to the physical damage whereas the insurers argued that it should also include consequential damages.

== Judgment ==
=== High Court ===
The High Court held that section 2 only provided for compensation for the physical damage suffered and not any consequential loss of profits or rent.

=== Court of Appeal ===
The Court of Appeal reversed the decision of the High Court and held that section 2 provided a right to compensation for all heads of loss. The Master of the Rolls, Lord Dyson stated:

It does not matter whether consequential losses such as loss of profits were recoverable from a trespasser in tort in 1886. In principle, section 2(1) covers all heads of loss compensable under English law for damage to property caused by trespassers in the course of a riot and the heads of compensation recoverable are to be determined with reference to the English law of damages as it develops over time.

— Paragraph 123, [2014] EWCA Civ 682

=== Supreme Court ===
In the lead judgment Lord Hodge emphasised that the Riot (Damages) Act 1886 must be considered in the context of previous legislative history. Compensation following a riot was first provided for by Parliament in the Riot Act 1714 and although the scope of compensation was not defined; subsequent case law made it clear that "statutory compensation was confined to physical damage to property." On this basis the Supreme Court unanimously allowed the appeal by the MOPC.

== Aftermath ==
In the wake of the 2011 riots it was felt that the wording of the Riot (Damages) Act 1886 was archaic and therefore created uncertainty as regards interpretation. As such section 10 of the Riot Compensation Act 2016 repealed the Riot (Damages) Act 1886. Furthermore, section 8(2) of the 2016 Act now makes it clear that compensation will not generally extend to consequential damages.

== Reaction ==
The law firm that represented the MOPC in the case stated that "With many claims for consequential loss dependent on the outcome of this case, today's Supreme Court decision will likely save the UK taxpayer upwards of £80m."

== See also ==
- 2011 England riots
- Timeline of the 2011 England riots
- Riot (Damages) Act 1886
- 2016 Judgments of the Supreme Court of the United Kingdom
