= Éditions Dalloz =

French publisher specialised in legal matters

Éditions Dalloz, owned by Lefebvre Dalloz, is a France's main legal publisher. It was founded by Désiré Dalloz and his brother Armand in 1845. Dalloz was acquired by Groupe de La Cite in 1989. CEP acquired almost complete control of Groupe de La Cite in 1995. Havas acquired full ownership of CEP in 1997 and in 1998, Havas was acquired by the company that became Vivendi. Presses de la Cité became part of Vivendi Universal Publishing (VUP), which later became Editis. In 2011, Dalloz's turnover amounted to 51,256,788 euros, rising steadily since the company's creation (except during the war years). It became Lefebvre Dalloz in 2021.

Its main publications are:

- The Recueil Dalloz, legal journal created in 1824 by the Dalloz Brothers, under Charles X. It is the most prestigious French legal publication. It only publishes short-format articles.
- Law journals
- Encyclopedias
- Books

== See also ==
- Law of France
