= R v Jogee =

2016 British landmark legal case on joint enterprise

- Court: Supreme Court of the United Kingdom
- Full case name: R v Jogee (Appellant); Ruddock (Appellant) v The Queen (Respondent) (Jamaica)
- Argued: 27–29 October 2015
- Decided: 18 February 2016
- Neutral citation: [2016] UKSC 8

Case history
- Prior history: [2013] EWCA Crim 1433
- Subsequent action: Reversed in Chan Wing-Siu v The Queen [1985] AC 168

Holding
- The rule regarding joint enterprise has been wrongly interpreted since the case of Chan Wing-Siu v The Queen [1985] AC 168. The correct position is that the defendant must intentionally act or encourage the principal to act with the requisite intent in order to be found liable for the same offence.

Case opinions
- Majority: Lord Neuberger, Lady Hale, Lord Hughes, Lord Toulson and Lord Thomas

Area of law
- Joint enterprise

R v Jogee [2016] UKSC 8 was a 2016 judgment of the Supreme Court of the United Kingdom that reversed previous case law on joint enterprise. The Supreme Court delivered its ruling jointly with the Judicial Committee of the Privy Council, which was considering an appeal from Jamaica, Ruddock v The Queen [2016] UKPC 7.

== Facts ==
On 9 June 2011, Jogee and his co-defendant, Hirsi, spent the evening taking drugs and drinking alcohol causing their behaviour to become increasingly aggressive. Twice during the night the pair visited the house of Naomi Reid who was in a relationship with Paul Fyfe (referred to in the judgment as "the deceased"). After the second visit Reid sent Jogee a text asking him not to bring Hirsi back to her house in Rowlatts Hill but the men returned for a third time only minutes later. By this time Fyfe had returned to the house and an angry exchange ensued between him and the two defendants. At 2:30 am on 10 June 2011, Jogee was outside shouting encouragement to Hirsi who stabbed and killed Fyfe.

== Judgment ==
=== Crown Court ===
In a trial at Nottingham Crown Court the judge, Dobbs J, directed the jury as follows: "the appellant (Jogee) [is] guilty of murder if he participated in the attack on the deceased, by encouraging Hirsi, and realised when doing so that Hirsi might use the kitchen knife to stab the deceased with intent to cause him really serious harm". This direction accorded with the standard interpretation of the law regarding joint enterprise in the light of Chan Wing-Siu v The Queen [1985] AC 168. On this basis the appellant was found guilty of murder and was sentenced to life imprisonment and ordered to serve at least 20 years in prison before becoming eligible for parole.

=== Court of Appeal ===
The Court of Appeal approved the reasoning of the trial judge and the law as stated in Chan Wing-Siu. Laws LJ stated that "The mental element, the mens rea, of the secondary party's crime is an appreciation that the primary actor might inflict grievous bodily harm and a willingness to lend his support notwithstanding." Jogee's minimum term was, however, reduced from 20 years to 18 years.

=== Supreme Court ===
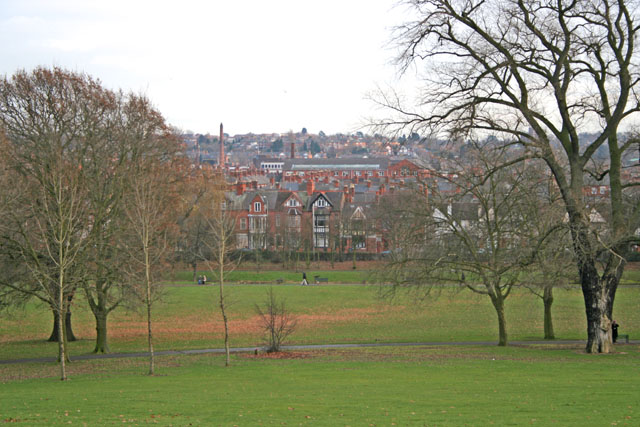
Both defendants were from the Spinney Hills area of Leicester.

The Supreme Court unanimously held that the law had taken a wrong turning since the decision in Chan Wing-Siu. In a joint lead judgment by Lords Hughes and Toulson, they concluded that a conviction under the principle of complicity required that the secondary party intended to assist the principal to commit the crime, and if that crime required fault (for example, that the principal must intend to kill) then the secondary party intended the principal to have that fault. The secondary party does not need to intend the principal to commit the crime, the secondary party might be indifferent to whether the crime is committed. However, in practice, most defendants are prosecuted on the basis that they were "all in it together", all intending the crime to take place. Paragraphs 89 and 90 of the judgment made this clear. They first describe the physical requirements of assistance or encouragement, and then turn to the fault elements:

"89. In cases of alleged secondary participation there are likely to be two issues. The first is whether the defendant was in fact a participant, that is, whether he assisted or encouraged the commission of the crime.

90. The second issue is likely to be whether the accessory intended to encourage or assist D1 to commit the crime, acting with whatever mental element the offence requires of D1... If the crime requires a particular intent, D2 must intend (it may be conditionally) to assist D1 to act with such intent."

Paragraph 90 went on to give some clarity on what must be intended:

"as a matter of law, it is enough that D2 intended to assist D1 to act with the requisite intent. That may well be the situation if the assistance or encouragement is rendered some time before the crime is committed and at a time when it is not clear what D1 may or may not decide to do. Another example might be where D2 supplies a weapon to D1, who has no lawful purpose in having it, intending to help D1 by giving him the means to commit a crime (or one of a range of crimes), but having no further interest in what he does, or indeed whether he uses it at all."

One very significant problem that remains centres on "conditional intention". As the court explained in paragraph 92:

"92. In cases of secondary liability arising out of a prior joint criminal venture, it will also often be necessary to draw the jury's attention to the fact that the intention to assist, and indeed the intention that the crime should be committed, may be conditional. The bank robbers who attack the bank when one or more of them is armed no doubt hope that it will not be necessary to use the guns, but it may be a perfectly proper inference that all were intending that if they met resistance the weapons should be used with the intent to do grievous bodily harm at least."

Finally, other existing rules about fault remain, such as that S must know enough about P's conduct to be able to know it was criminal (paragraphs 9 and 16) and that if P commits one of the offences that S intended to assist, it does not matter which one (paragraph 14).

The standard questions for liability as a participant to be established through the rules on complicity, therefore are:

1. Did the defendant assist or encourage the commission of the crime?
2. In this assistance or encouragement, did the defendant encourage or assist the principal to commit the crime, acting with whatever mental element the offence requires of the principal?

To elaborate on this point their Lordships gave an example: a defendant encourages the principal to take another person's bicycle and then return it after use but the principal in fact keeps the bicycle. In this scenario the principal will be guilty of theft but the defendant will only be guilty of the lesser offence of unauthorised taking because he has not encouraged the principal to act with the intent to permanently deprive (the mens rea of theft).

== Significance ==
The judgment has been described as "a call for prosecutors, judges and juries to return to the close consideration of the evidence before them without the crutch of a blunt principle". In a similar vein the judges in the case noted that there should not be an over-reliance on the weapon that is being carried by the principal. The weapon involved is a relevant piece of evidence but should be viewed as part of the wider context of the case.

Lord Neuberger explained that the judgement was unlikely to lead to large numbers of appeals against old convictions:

Where a conviction has been arrived at by faithfully applying the law as it stood at the time, it can be set aside only by seeking exceptional leave to appeal to the Court of Appeal out of time. That court has power to grant such leave, and may do so if substantial injustice be demonstrated, but it will not do so simply because the law applied has now been declared to have been mistaken.

== Reaction ==
Charlotte Henry's brother was convicted under the Chan Wing-Siu interpretation of joint enterprise. She reacted to the judgment by saying "When the judgment was delivered I heard everyone catch their breath. My mother fell into uncontrollable sobs of relief. Finally we are hopeful that my brother will come home and we will be a family again."

The wife of the deceased in the case said that she was "shocked and devastated" by the decision. The daughter of the deceased believed "Hirsi used a knife, Jogee used Hirsi"

== Subsequent developments ==
On 8 April 2016, the Supreme Court ordered that Jogee was to be retried on the charge of murder, "with the included alternative of manslaughter". Jogee was cleared of murder at his retrial at the Nottingham Crown Court, but was convicted of manslaughter. As a result, on 12 September 2016, his previous term of life imprisonment with a minimum term of 18 years was replaced by a fixed-term sentence of 12 years, to include time already served as a result of his original conviction for murder. Jogee was released from prison in June 2017. He was later convicted of conspiracy to supply Class A drugs in November 2019 and sentenced to two years and four months in prison.

While hailed as an important criminal law development at the time it was handed down for its effects on cases after 2016 the judgment has subsequently come to be seen by many legal commentators and joint enterprise campaigners as having had little impact upon the cases that had already been decided and consequently as offering little help to potential victims of miscarriages of justice from the pre-2016 period. The first round of post-Jogee appeals, the consolidated cases of Johnson & Others, R. v (Rev 1)[2016] EWCA Crim 1613, resulted in all the convictions being upheld and it was not until 2018, in the case of R v Crilly [2018] EWCA Crim 168 that a conviction was overturned through application of the Jogee principles. Shortly after Crilly's successful appeal, Paul Taylor KC, the head of the Doughty Street Chambers Appeal Unit, which had represented Crilly, commented that the combined effect of the Supreme Court's 'substantial injustice' test at paragraph 100 of their judgment, as well as the additional tests laid down by the Court of Appeal in Johnson & Others, would combine to severely limit the number of successful appeals. A high-profile 2016 case in Manchester which resulted in 11 murder convictions on the basis of joint enterprise has been cited as further evidence of the limited impact of the decision.

By 2021, only 2 of 103 appeals made with reference to Jogee had succeeded, prompting Felicity Gerry KC, who was lead counsel for Jogee at the Supreme Court, to criticise the Criminal Cases Review Commission for "ha[ving] taken the disappointing approach of accepting the injustices perpetuated by the court in choosing factual options to uphold wrongly achieved convictions". A report from the Centre for Crime and Justice Studies, published in April 2022, suggested that the number of people charged on a joint enterprise basis had in fact risen in the five years after the judgment, and that the number of black defendants convicted for murder as secondary participants had doubled. Similarly, a New York Times investigation published in November 2022 found that in the five years after the Jogee judgment was handed down, Ministry of Justice data showed that the number of homicide cases involving four or more defendants increased by 42 percent and convictions by nearly 50 percent. Black defendants were three times as likely as white ones to be prosecuted using joint enterprise, during this period.

In Hong Kong (where the case of Chan Wing-Siu originated), the Hong Kong Court of Final Appeal rejected Jogee in HKSAR v Chan Kam Shing. In the leading judgment delivered by Ribeiro PJ, the court believed that joint criminal enterprise does not over-extend the liability of accomplices, that Jogee leave a serious gap in the law of criminal complicity, and the concept of "conditional intent" creates significant conceptual and practical problems.

== See also ==
- Criminal law of England
- 2016 Judgments of the Supreme Court of the United Kingdom
