= OW Bunker =

OW Bunker A/S
- Type: Publicly traded aktieselskab
- Traded as: Nasdaq Nordic: OW
- Industry: Marine Fuel Traders
- Founded: 1980
- Founders: Ove Wrists
- Defunct: 7 November 2014
- Fate: Bankruptcy
- Headquarters: Nørresundby, Denmark
- Area served: Worldwide
- Number of employees: 622 (2013)

OW Bunker, founded in 1980, was a marine fuel (bunker) company based at Nørresundby in northern Denmark. It was the world's largest bunker supplier until its collapse on 7 November 2014. It went from initial public offering (IPO) to bankruptcy in less than a year. The dramatic collapse of the company led to expedited litigation in the English courts (as all the contracts had been declared to be "subject to English Law").

== OW Bunker test case: the Res Cogitans ==
The case was given priority, progressing from an arbitration through the Commercial Court and the Court of Appeal to the Supreme Court in the record time of only ten months.

The particular factors of this extraordinary case were these: OW Bunker (OWB) was an intermediary supplier of bunkers to ships. In many cases, it subcontracted this to other wholesale suppliers, obtaining fuel from them on credit. OWB did not require its customers to make immediate payment for bunker, but instead allowed the ships to pay for bunker after it was consumed.

After the bankruptcy, the ship Res Cogitans had consumed unpaid fuel, and no money had traded hands. Both OWB's assignee, and the subcontractor which had physically delivered the bunker were pressing the ship's owners for payment. To whom, if anyone, was payment due? Payment was due to OWB by contract, but the subcontractor claimed that the supply of bunker was not a sale of goods, the bunkers were still their property, and they were entitled to be paid by the ship if OWB was not able to pay on the ship's behalf.

The legal question was: "was the agreement to supply bunkers a 'contract of sale of goods' within the meaning of s.2(1) of the Sale of Goods Act 1979 (as amended)?"; to which the answer was "No!".

Instead, it was a special one-off arrangement to permit to consumption of bunkers without transferring property (i.e. ownership) in the goods to the consumer. Thus, although it seemed that the ship had "bought" the bunkers from the seller, nevertheless because of the "Romalpa clause" (a retained right of title provision), the "transaction" was not a "sale" but instead a bailment whereby the "seller" (actually, bailor) granted lawful possession to the "buyer" (actually, bailee), with the right ONLY to use the bunkers for ship propulsion. The bunkers could not be sold, mixed, pledged or trans-shipped. It was noted that, despite being a bailment, the bunkers could be consumed, since bailment requires the goods to be cared for and returned, and that consuming the bunkers destroyed the goods and was thus a tortious act.

The effect of this was that although the ships which had consumed the fuel may have paid for them, after OWB's insolvency, such ships were then liable to pay a second time to the original supplier, since property in the goods had not passed to the "buyer".

The result was that hundreds of shipowners who were impacted by the bankruptcy were declared doubly liable for the fuel cost. This resulted in considerable rewriting of bunker supply contracts, in case another a similar insolvency occurred.
