= Cox v Ministry of Justice =

Supreme Court of the United Kingdom case

- Court: UK Supreme Court
- Citation: [2016] AC 660

Cox v Ministry of Justice [2016] AC 660 is an English tort law case, concerning vicarious liability in English law.

== Facts ==
A prisoner (Mr Inder) lost his balance and dropped a sack of rice on the back of Mrs Cox, a prison catering manager. Prisoners were not employees of the prison service, since they worked under compulsion through a government programme. Mrs Cox sought to hold the Ministry of Justice vicariously liable for the acts of the prisoner.

At first instance, the court held the relationship to the prison service was not "akin to employment". The Court of Appeal overturned this.

== Judgment ==
The Supreme Court held the prisoner’s relationship was akin to employment, and so the prison was liable.

== See also ==
- English tort law
