= Désiré Dalloz =

French jurist, politician and publisher (1795–1869)

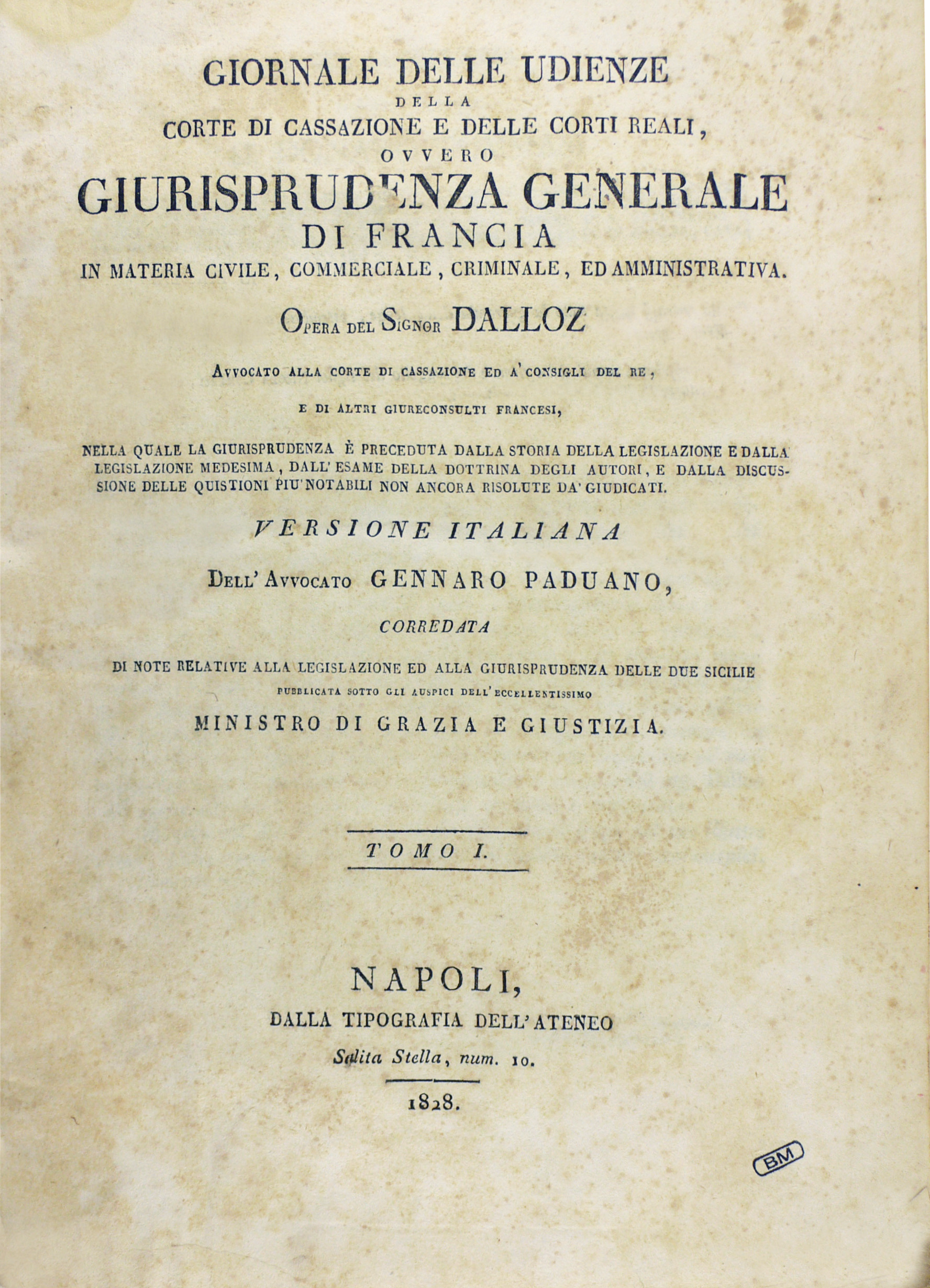
Giornale delle udienze, 1828.

Désiré Dalloz (12 August 1795 – 12 January 1869) was a French jurist, politician and publisher.

== Life ==
Born in Septmoncel, Jura, he pursued the profession of an advocate. He was admitted to the bar of the Cour royale in 1817, and practiced law before the French high courts from 1823 to 1836. His oral arguments were reproduced in legal journals such as Moniteur and Gazette des tribunaux. Dalloz represented the département of Jura in Parliament from 1837 to 1848, supporting the House of Orléans. He died in Paris after having suffered from paralysis for twenty years.

His principal contribution to French law is the advancement of the study of judicial decisions. Dalloz headed a journal dedicated to that purpose, the Jurisprudence du royaume. Recueil periodique et critique. In 1832 he published the Répertoire de jurisprudence générale du royaume, an index, summary and reference of all contemporary judicial decisions; an expanded and updated version was published from 1845 to 1870. Together with his brother Armand, he founded the legal publishing house Dalloz, which still publishes the Recueil Dalloz.

== Bibliography ==
- Montazel, Laurence (2001). "Dalloz, Désiré". In Michael Stolleis (ed.). Juristen: ein biographisches Lexikon; von der Antike bis zum 20. Jahrhundert (in German) (2nd ed.). München: Beck. p. 157. ISBN 3-406-45957-9.
