= Common purpose =

Criminal joint enterprise

The doctrine of common purpose, common design, joint enterprise, joint criminal enterprise or parasitic accessory liability is a common law legal doctrine that imputes criminal liability to the participants in a criminal enterprise for all reasonable results from that enterprise. The common purpose doctrine was established in English law, and later adopted in other common-law jurisdictions including Scotland, Ireland, Australia, Trinidad and Tobago, the Solomon Islands, Texas, the International Criminal Court, and the International Criminal Tribunal for the former Yugoslavia.

Common design also applies in the law of tort. It is a different legal test from that which applies in the criminal law. The difference between common designs in the criminal law and the civil law was illustrated in NCB v Gamble [1959] 1 QB 11 at 23, by Devlin LJ:

the consequence [in the criminal law] is that selling a person a gun knowing that person will use it to kill someone else will make the seller an accessory to the murder but will not in itself make him liable in tort.

The difference applies in US law as well. The United States Supreme Court reached the same conclusion in Sony Corporation of America v Universal City Studios Inc. 464 US 417 (1984). The supply of equipment for copying video cassettes did not give rise to joint liability in tort for copyright infringement. There was no encouragement to copy music and therefore no liability as an accessory. The difference lies between mere knowledge at the point of sale and action combined with common intention: Metro-Goldwyn-Mayer Studios Inc. v Grokster Ltd. 545 US 913 (2005): see p. 931. A different result was reached in Metro-Goldwyn-Mayer by the US Supreme Court. There was a common design there because the defendants "distribute[d] a device with the object of promoting its use to infringe copyright". That test was satisfied because clear statements and positive steps were taken by the administrators of the website to encourage infringement.

A common application of the rule is to impute criminal liability for wounding a person to participants in a riot who knew, or were reckless as to knowing, that one of their number had a knife and might use it, despite the fact that the other participants did not have knives themselves. In England and Wales and certain other Commonwealth countries, this was the understanding of the courts until February 2016, when the Supreme Court of the United Kingdom and the Judicial Committee of the Privy Council jointly ruled in R v Jogee that it was wrong, and that nothing less than intent to assist the crime would do.

== Jurisdictions ==
=== English law ===
An old example of this doctrine in English law is R v Swindall and Osborne (1846) 2 Car. & K. 230. Two cart drivers engaged in a race. One of them ran down and killed a pedestrian. It was not known which one had driven the fatal cart, but since they were encouraging each other in the race, it was irrelevant which of them had actually struck the man and both were held jointly liable. Thus the parties must share a common purpose and make it clear to each other by their actions that they are acting on their common intention, so that each member of the group assumes responsibility for the actions of the whole group. When this happens, all that flows from the execution of the plan makes them all liable. This is a question of causation, in that oblique intention will be imputed for intermediate consequences that are a necessary precondition to achieving the ultimate purpose, and liability will follow where there are accidental and unforeseen departures from the plan, so long as there is no novus actus interveniens to break the chain.

Until 2016, in cases where there is violence beyond the level anticipated, the prosecution had to prove:

1. that an act was done by D that in fact assisted the later commission of the offence,
2. that D did the act deliberately, realising that it was capable of assisting the offence,
3. that D at the time of doing the act contemplated the commission of the offence by A, i.e. he foresaw it as a "real or substantial risk" or "real possibility", and
4. that D when doing the act intended to assist A in what he was doing.

In R v Jogee [2016] UKSC 8 the UK Supreme Court decided that (c) was wrong, and that the prosecution actually had to prove that D had intended to assist A to commit the crime, and this normally meant (but did not have to mean) that D intended A to commit the crime.

==== Deliberate departure ====
Where one of the participants deliberately departs from the common purpose by doing something that was not authorised or agreed upon, that participant alone is liable for the consequences. In the situation exemplified in Davies v DPP [1954] AC 378, a group comes together for a fight or to commit a crime, and either the participant knows or does not know that one of the group has a weapon. If the person knows that there is a weapon, it is foreseeable that it might be used and the fact that the other participants do not instruct the one carrying to leave it behind means that its use must be within the scope of their intention. However, if the person does not know of the weapon, this is a deliberate departure from the common purpose and this breaks the enterprise.

==== When the outcome is death ====
The simplest form of joint enterprise to murder is two or more planning to cause death and doing so. If all the parties participated in carrying out the plan, all are liable, regardless of who actually inflicted the fatal injury. However, when there is no plan to murder and one party kills while carrying out a plan to do something else, such as a planned robbery in which the participants hope to be able to get what they want without killing anyone, but one of them in fact kills, the other participants may still be guilty of murder or manslaughter if they had the necessary mens rea.

In R v Craig & Bentley (1953), Derek Bentley was hanged for the murder of a police officer, committed in the course of a burglary attempt. The murder was committed by a friend and accomplice of Bentley's, Christopher Craig, then aged 16. Bentley was convicted as a party to the murder, by English law principle of common criminal purpose "joint enterprise". The judge in court (Lord Chief Justice Goddard) sentenced Bentley to death based on an interpretation of the phrase "Let him have it" (Bentley's alleged instruction to Craig), describing Bentley as "mentally aiding the murder of Police Constable Sidney Miles". In 1998, Bentley received a posthumous pardon.

In R v Lovesey and Peterson (1969) 530 million. App. R. 461, a gang was executing a plan to overpower a jeweller and steal his more valuable stock. After the robbery, the jeweller was found dead. All were properly convicted of murder because the death was the outcome of the agreed use of violence. That this accidentally caused the jeweller's death did not prevent liability. The usual case will involve plans to commit criminal damage, burglary, rape or some other crime, and there will be no compelling inference that there must also have been a plan to kill. For the participants to be convicted of murder, the question becomes one of foresight that one of them might kill.

In R v Powell (Anthony) and English [1999] 1 AC 1, the House of Lords said that the other participants must have realised that, in the course of the joint enterprise, the primary party might kill with intent to do so or with intent to cause grievous bodily harm: with the intent necessary for murder. Thus, the Powell and English doctrine extends joint enterprise liability from the paradigm case of a plan to murder to the case of a plan to commit another offence in the course of which the possibility of a murder is foreseen (see R v Bryce. 2004).

In Attorney General's Reference (No. 3 of 2004) (2005) EWCA Crim 1882, the defendant, H, was charged with manslaughter. H had sent K and C to terrify R, knowing both that K and C would have a loaded firearm with them, and that this firearm might be fired near R to increase his fear. The Court of Appeal held that H's liability depended on the scope of the joint enterprise. On the assumed facts, there was no evidence that H foresaw that the gun would be fired and R might be injured. Rather, K's intentional act of firing the gun so as to kill or cause R grievous bodily harm was fundamentally different from the acts contemplated by H. The outcome would have been different if there had been a common design to cause some harm to R. In such a case, H would be liable for manslaughter because, albeit to frighten, he had authorised the firing of the gun: he would have realised that K might intentionally cause some harm when he fired the gun. However, on the assumed facts, H did not foresee the possibility of any harm to R, let alone intentional harm, so he was properly acquitted.

In R v Gnango [2011] UKSC 59, the Supreme Court held that D2 is guilty of the offence of murdering V if (1) D1 and D2 voluntarily engage in fighting each other, each intending to kill or cause grievous bodily harm to the other and each foreseeing that the other has the reciprocal intention, and if (2) D1 mistakenly kills V in the course of the fight. Baker argues that the case was wrongly decided because it did not rest on oblique intention, invoked joint-perpetration where there was none, invoked the "provocative act murder doctrine where it did not apply, and overly restricted the incidental party/victim rule without seeing that it did not apply because the actual victim as opposed to the putative victim (Gnango) did not consent to being harmed."

In R v Jogee [2016] UKSC 8, the Supreme Court decided that intent, not mere foresight, must be proved to convict an accomplice of a crime of specific intent, such as murder. The court said "foresight of what might happen is ordinarily no more than evidence from which a jury can infer the presence of a requisite intention. It may be strong evidence, but its adoption as a test for the mental element for murder in the case of a secondary party is a serious and anomalous departure from the basic rule, which results in over-extension of the law of murder." He summarised the law as: "If the crime requires a particular intent, D2 must intend ... to assist D1 to act with such intent." (This appeal was heard jointly with an appeal from Jamaica to the Judicial Committee of the Privy Council, with the same judges, Ruddock v The Queen [2016] UKPC 7.)

==== Repentance ====
One person who has been an active member of a group with a common purpose may escape liability by withdrawing before the others go on to commit the crime. Mere repentance without any action, however, leaves the party liable. To be effective, the withdrawing party must actively seek to prevent the others from relying on what has been done. In R v Becerra (1975) 62 Crim. App. R. 212 it was held that any communication of withdrawal by the secondary party to the perpetrator must be such as to serve "unequivocal notice" upon the other party to the common purpose that, if he proceeds upon it, he does so without the further aid and assistance of the withdrawing party.:

- If an accomplice only advised or encouraged the principal to commit the crime, he must at least communicate his withdrawal to the other parties.
- Where an accomplice has supplied the principal with the means of committing the crime, the accomplice must arguably neutralise, or at least take all reasonable steps to neutralise, the aid he has given.
- In more serious cases, it may be that the only effective withdrawal is either physical intervention or calling in the police.

In R v Rook (1997) Cr. App. R. 327, the court held that, as in the case of joint enterprise where both parties are present at the scene of the crime, it is not necessary for the prosecution to show that a secondary party who lends assistance or encouragement before the commission of the crime intended the victim to be killed, or to suffer serious injury, provided it was proved that he foresaw the event as a real or substantial risk and nonetheless lent his assistance.

Rook was convicted as one of a gang of three men who met and agreed the details of a contract killing of the wife of a fourth man on the next day. Rook did not turn up the next day and the killing was done by his two fellows. His defence was that he never intended the victim to be killed and believed that, if he failed to appear, the others would not go through with the plan. Lloyd LJ. described the evidence against him in this way:

So the position, on his own evidence, was that he took a leading part in the planning of the murder. He foresaw that the murder would, or at least might, take place. For a time he stalled the others. But he did nothing to stop them, and, apart from his absence on the Thursday, he did nothing to indicate to them that he had changed his mind.

This did not amount to an unequivocal communication of his withdrawal from the scheme contemplated at the time he gave his assistance.

=== Hong Kong law ===
In Chan Wing-siu, a criminal appeal from the Supreme Court of Hong Kong, the Privy Council held that if D1 and D2 set out to commit an offence (crime A), and in the joint of the enterprise, D1 commits another offence (crime B) beyond the scope of the plan, and D2 could foresee the commission of crime B (rather than real intention), D2 would be guilty as an accomplice of crime B. At the time of this judgement, Hong Kong was still a British colony, and under the Hong Kong Basic Law, most case law, including Chan Wing-siu, is retained as Hong Kong law after the handover.

In the UK, Chan Wing-siu was jointly overturned by the Supreme Court and the Privy Council in Jogee, as it is wrong, as a matter of law, to equate "foresight" with "intention to assist or encourage", the right direction is that "foresight" will be nothing more than evidence from which the jury could infer intention as to crime B.

In Hong Kong, however, the Court of Final Appeal, in Chan Kam-shing, refused to follow Jogee, as it thought "abolition of the joint criminal enterprise doctrine would leave a serious gap in the law of criminal complicity", and "the concept of conditional intent introduced in the Jogee decision caused conceptual and practical difficulties". Therefore, the Chan Wing-siu principle is still good law in Hong Kong.

In a landmark decision, Secretary for Justice v Tong Wai Hung, the Court of Final Appeal clarifies the approach for determining principal liability for unlawful assembly and riot, held that the Chan Wing-siu principle is not applicable to the unlawful assembly and riot.

In 2021, the Court of Final Appeal held in HKSAR v Lo Kin Man [2021] HKCFA 37 that the basic joint criminal enterprise doctrine is inapplicable to cases related to unlawful assembly and rioting, while extended joint criminal enterprise liability may still operate if it is proved that the persons have agreed to participate together in the criminal assembly and foresaw commission of another criminal offence.

== Controversy ==
The use of this doctrine has caused concern among academics and practitioners in the legal community and has been the subject of an investigation by the House of Commons Justice Select Committee in the UK. In 2010, a campaign group was formed in the UK called JENGbA (Joint Enterprise: Not Guilty by Association), which seeks reform of the law and supports those convicted by this means. JENGbA asserts that the misapplication of the principle constitutes a form of human rights abuse.

On 6 July 2014, Common, a 90-minute television drama written by Jimmy McGovern, was shown on BBC One. It examined the issues surrounding a case of joint enterprise or common unlawful purpose murder. On 7 July 2014, a documentary regarding a number of joint enterprise cases, Guilty by Association, was also shown on BBC One.

One of these cases is that of Alex Henry, convicted in March 2014 at the Old Bailey alongside Janhelle Grant-Murray and Cameron Ferguson, for the murder of Taqui Khezihi and the non-fatal stabbing of Bourhane Khezihi. The court heard how Alex Henry was shopping in Ealing Broadway on a Tuesday afternoon in August 2013 with his two co-defendants. He exited the shopping centre with Ferguson to see Grant-Murray being confronted by a group of four older men who were unknown to all defendants. CCTV showed that Grant-Murray was holding a wine bottle by the neck and Bourhane Khezihi had removed his belt to use as a knuckle duster. A combination of CCTV evidence and mobile phone video footage was used to piece together the 47-second affray in which Alex Henry can be seen running into the affray and running back to the shopping centre. At trial Cameron Ferguson pleaded guilty to murder and grievous bodily harm. Alex Henry and Janhelle Grant-Murray were both found guilty by a majority verdict of 11–1. It was their presence at the scene of the spontaneous 47-second affray which was held to amount to encouragement of the stabbing. They both received a life sentence with a minimum prison term of 19 years.

On 25 February 2015, an appeal by two convicted murderers, Gerard Childs and Stephen Price, of a Prescot retail park murder, of Jonathan Fitchett, to the Court of Appeal was successful. A young man, Jonathan Fitchett, had been killed at a retail park after an altercation with Childs, who was joined by his friend Price. Although both defendants had punched the victim, an expert medical witness said that just a single punch was fatal, and it was unknown who threw the fatal punch. The Liverpool Crown Court had convicted both of murder using the device of common purpose. The Appeal Court found that there had been no intent to cause really serious injury (the mens rea of murder at common law), and that there was no evidence of "common purpose". The first defendant's conviction was reduced to manslaughter, and the second was reduced to affray. The Court said that for common purpose/joint enterprise to arise, there must be satisfactory evidence of a joint plan. (The absence of precise actus reus was glossed over.)

== See also ==
- Felony murder rule
- Joint criminal enterprise
- Art and part, a similar principle under Scots law
- R v Betts and Ridley
