= Brussels II =

European Union regulation

Regulation (EC) No 1347/2000
- European Union regulation
- Title: Council Regulation concerning jurisdiction and the recognition and enforcement of judgments in matrimonial matters and the matters of parental responsibility, repealing Regulation (EC) No 1347/2000
- Applicability: all EU Member States, except Denmark
- Made by: Council
- Made under: Article 61(c) and Article 67(1) TEC
- Journal reference: L 338, 23 December 2003 pp1-29

History
- Date made: 29 May 2000
- Entry into force: 1 March 2001

Other legislation
- Replaces: Brussels Convention (1968) and Brussels I
- Replaced by: Brussels II-A (EU) No 2201/2003

Regulation (EC) No 2201/2003
- European Union regulation
- Title: Council Regulation concerning jurisdiction and the recognition and enforcement of judgments in matrimonial matters and the matters of parental responsibility, repealing Regulation (EC) No 1347/2000
- Applicability: all EU Member States, except Denmark
- Made by: Council
- Made under: Article 61(c) and Article 67(1) TEC
- Journal reference: L 338, 23 December 2003 pp1-29

History
- Date made: 27 November 2003
- Entry into force: 1 August 2004
- Implementation date: 1 March 2005

Other legislation
- Replaces: 1347/2000

Brussels II Regulation (EC) No 1347/2000, which came into force on 1 March 2001, sets out a system for the allocation of jurisdiction and the reciprocal enforcement of judgments between European Union Member States and was modelled on the 1968 Brussels Convention on Jurisdiction and the Enforcement of Judgments in Civil and Commercial Matters. It was intended to regulate domains that were excluded from the Brussels Convention and Brussels I. The Brussels II Regulation deals with conflict of law issues in family law between member states; in particular those related to divorce and child custody. The Regulation seeks to facilitate free movement of divorce and related judgments between Member States.

The original Brussels II Regulation has since been recast, repealed, and replaced by its current version, Brussels II-A (EU) No 2201/2003, which has been in force since 1 March 2005.

Brussels II-A (EU) Regulation No 2201/2003 was replaced, as of 1 August 2022, by Council Regulation (EU) 2019/1111 of 25 June 2019 on jurisdiction, the recognition and enforcement of decisions in matrimonial matters and the matters of parental responsibility, and on international child abduction (recast).

The Regulation applies to all European Union member states except Denmark.

== Background ==
On 1 March 2001, Council Regulation (EC) No 1347/2000 of 29 May 2000 on Jurisdiction and the Recognition and Enforcement of Judgments in Matrimonial Matters and in Matters of Parental Responsibility for Children of both Spouses (Brussels II) came into force. The Regulation marked a departure for the European Community and was the first in a series of legislative instruments dealing with jurisdictional issues as they arise in relation to family law issues.

The original Brussels II Regulation provided an exclusive list of jurisdictional bases that must be used when a matter falls within their scope. Since the grounds of jurisdiction are common across all contracting states, once a judgment is handed down the original exercise of jurisdiction cannot be challenged. Further, recognition and enforcement can only be opposed on extremely limited grounds.

=== Recast regulation ===
The original Regulation was replaced with Council Regulation (EC) No 2201/2003 concerning jurisdiction and the recognition and enforcement of judgments, which came into force on 1 August 2004 and applies from 1 March 2005 in matrimonial matters and the matters of parental responsibility. The revised Brussels II legislation is variously referred to as Brussels II bis or B, or Brussels IIA, or the new Brussels II, and repeals the older regulation.

Both regulations applied to all EU member states except Denmark.

All member states of the European Union have also become party to the Convention on Jurisdiction, Applicable Law, Recognition, Enforcement and Co-operation in Respect of Parental Responsibility and Measures for the Protection of Children (Convention), which largely overlaps with this regulation. For cases within the European Union, the Regulation takes precedence over the convention. The European Union authorized the signature and ratification of the convention with Council decisions 2003/93 and 2008/431, respectively. The authorization was necessary as the European Union and the member states had a shared competence over all matters of the Convention and because the Convention did not provide for the signature of "Regional Economic Integration Organizations".

== Articles and Scope ==
The issues covered in the Brussels II Regulation regime can be divided into two categories: matrimonial proceedings and concurrent parental responsibility proceedings. Article 1(1)(a) provides that the Regulation shall apply to "civil proceedings relating to divorce, legal separation or marriage annulment." This first section is only concerned with covering the actual proceedings that end a marriage. The second part of Article 1(1) states that the regulation shall apply to "civil proceedings relating to parental responsibility for the children of both spouses on the occasion of the matrimonial proceedings referred to in (a)". This section is also only dealing with a narrow subset of the potential civil proceedings that might arise with regard to parental responsibility, those that deal with children of both spouses where the children are habitually resident in a Member State and that arise on the occasion of the matrimonial proceeding identified in Article 1(1)(a).

Like civil and commercial matters, compromises (settlements) have been made to establish a common jurisdictional framework aimed at achieving certainty within the 14 European Member states as a whole, excluding Denmark. Article 2 of the Regulation sets our seven jurisdiction bases, all of equal status, with regard to divorce, legal separation, and nullity actions. These jurisdictional bases open up jurisdiction to the courts of the member state in which the spouses are habitually resident, or in the case of a joint application, either of the spouses is habitually resident, the spouses were last habitually resident, insofar as one of them still resides there, the applicant is habitually resident provided this is reinforced by 12 or 6 months residence, or jurisdiction may be founded on the couple's common nationality.

Regarding cases involving parental responsibility, Article 3 states that the courts having jurisdiction in the matrimonial proceedings covered by Article 2 are able to take jurisdiction in a matter relating to parental responsibility over a child of both spouses where the child is habitually resident in that Member State. That being said, under Article 3(2) where the child is not habitually resident in the Member State that has jurisdiction over the matrimonial proceedings, but is nevertheless habitually resident in another Member State, the jurisdiction of the former is restricted to cases where: (a) at least one of the spouses has parental responsibility to the child; and (b) the jurisdiction of the courts has been accepted by the spouses and is in the best interests of the child.

In order to ensure that no jurisdictional conflicts arise, the Regulation employs a lis pendens provision based on the strict application of the prior temporis formula. This means that the court second seised will stay its proceedings until the jurisdiction of the court first seised is established. Article 11 provides certainty but also restricts flexibility. Article 7 states that the grounds of jurisdiction in Articles 2-6 are exclusive, however, Article 8 provides that member states may have recourse to their residual grounds of jurisdiction whenever no court of a Member State has jurisdiction under Articles 2-6.

The challenges that exist in determining the scope of the Regulation in terms of jurisdiction do not apply in terms of recognition and enforcement. Under recognition and enforcement it is clear that where a judgment is delivered to one Member State, regardless of the jurisdictional basis, it will be recognized by the other Member states without any special procedure required.

Despite recognition being automatic, it is still open to any interested party to apply for a decision that the judgment not be recognized. While the mechanics for this are grounded in national law, the grounds of non-recognition are restricted to those provided by Article 15 of the regulation. Regarding enforcement, Article 21 refers exclusively to judgments on the exercise of parental responsibility, as recognition of an order ending a matrimonial relationship is sufficient.

== See also ==
- International child abduction
- Hague Abduction Convention
- Hague Divorce Convention
