= Recueil Dalloz =

French legal journal

The Recueil Dalloz, nicknamed Le Dalloz or Le Recueil and known by various names throughout history, is a French legal journal. It was created in 1824 by Désiré Dalloz and his brother Armand as a continuation of the weekly Sirey law review that started in 1791.

It is regarded as an influential law journal in France. In French legal literature, the journal is simply abbreviated with the letter "D.". It is the only legal review and non-governmental publication (i.e. except concepts like "statute", "decree" or "ordinance") abbreviated with a single letter in France.

It published weekly short articles only, but the annual total of pages is particularly voluminous and may be the most voluminous one among French legal reviews. It is a generalist law review that publishes court cases commentaries, news and substantial research.

Due to its success, the publishing house Dalloz was created in 1845. In 2024, to mark the journal's bicentennial, an anthology was published as a book.

Through history, it has been called:

- 1791-1824: Journal des audiences de la Cour de cassation ou Recueil des principaux arrêts rendus par cette cour en matière civile et mixte.
- 1825-1902: Jurisprudence générale en matière civile, commerciale, criminelle.
- 1903-1923: Dalloz Jurisprudence générale.
- 1924-1944: Idem, and Dalloz Recueil hebdomadaire de jurisprudence en matière civile, commerciale, administrative et de droit public
- 1945-1955: Recueil Dalloz analytique et critique de doctrine, de jurisprudence et de législation.
- 1955-1956: Recueil Dalloz et Recueil Sirey
- 1956-1964: Recueil Dalloz de doctrine, de jurisprudence et de législation
- 1965-1996: Recueil Dalloz Sirey de doctrine, de jurisprudence et de législation.
- 1997-1999: Recueil Dalloz de doctrine, de jurisprudence et de législation.
- Since 1999: Recueil Dalloz
