= Criminal deportation =

Criminal sentence

At law, criminal deportation is where a person is ordered deported or physically removed from a country by reason of such alien's criminal conduct.

== In United States ==
Following the 1993 World Trade Center bombing and the Oklahoma City bombing in 1995, U.S. President Bill Clinton signed the Antiterrorism and Effective Death Penalty Act (AEDPA), the Illegal Immigration Reform and Immigrant Responsibility Act (IIRIRA), which made deportation mandatory for certain aliens sentenced to a year or more of imprisonment for an aggravated felony conviction.

In 2003, the Immigration and Naturalization Service (INS) was abolished and replaced by the now Department of Homeland Security (DHS). In 2004, the DHS launched Operation Endgame, a strategy to remove all deportable aliens. In 2005, a Homeland Security Spending Bill increased funds for immigration law enforcement to ten billion dollars, significantly raising the number of border patrol agents, immigration investigators and interior detention personnel.

In 2006, Congress began considering more reform proposals that would impose even harsher restrictions for aliens who have broken the law and expand the definition of deportable crimes even further. As a result, minor past offenses can increasingly be used as grounds for expulsion.

== Other countries and territories ==
Anyone deported from Canada for violating immigration law and criminal laws will have to successfully apply for an authorization to return, although such an authorization may or may not be granted.

Any non-citizen of a European Union member state or territory ever given a life sentence or otherwise given a determinate sentence of at least 4 years will typically, if living in the UK proper, be deported.

Any non-citizen resident of New Zealand who has ever been given a prison sentence of at least 5 years will typically be deported from that British Commonwealth member state, with any other non-citizen resident who has, within the past decade before deportation, otherwise served a sentence of at least 12 months.

Any non-citizen resident with a "substantial criminal record" (even if such record does not include sex offences) will typically be removed from Australia if living there. However, the Australian Administrative Tribunals has stopped the deportation of many convicts for various reasons.

Some of the countries in the Persian Gulf have deported foreign nationals as well as their own citizens. They've paid the Comoros Islands to take them.

== See also ==
- Deportation and removal from the United States
