= Legal evolution =

Branch of legal theory

Legal evolution is a branch of legal theory which proposes that law and legal systems change and develop according to regular, natural laws. It is closely related to social evolution and was developed in the 18th century, peaking in popularity in the 19th century before entering a prolonged hiatus. Legal evolution saw a revival at the end of the 20th century and is continued in multiple contemporary theories. Theories of legal evolution use a variety of methodologies, including elements of sociological, historical, philosophical approaches.

== Methodology and theory ==
Wigmore explained legal evolution using analogies to the complex attraction and repulsion of planets

The term 'legal evolution' covers a broad range of theories with different goals and approaches, but the theories share several features. Theories of legal evolution attempt to provide an explanation for the ways in which law changes with reference to wider factors outside the legal system. For example, the German historical school suggested that law developed alongside the nation containing it, an idea carried on by Henry Maine (1822-1888) in Britain in his theory of 'progressive evolution'. Likewise, legal memetics explains legal development according to the interplay between external information in society and its process of 'encoding' within legal rules. Another common thesis suggests that legal development is progressive, with legal systems tending towards greater complexity, completeness, or 'advancement'. John Millar (1735-1801) proposed, for instance, that legal systems progressed from hunter-gathering societies with minimal property to modern systems of international commerce.

Theories of legal evolution deploy a wide range of methodological tools. The German historical school was noteworthy for its use of a rigorous historical methodology, paying close attention to primary sources and manuscripts. Another common source of material, anthropological studies, include (for example) surveys of Native Americans, which evolutionary theorists use to deduce a progression of rules from primitive societies to modern market ones. The evolutionary theorist might also rely upon universal laws of morals or upon general sociological hypotheses to explain a natural trend in legal development. A persistent theme is the frequent use of scientific metaphor. Maine in his work "Ancient Law" drew upon scientific theories of geology and possibly upon Darwinism, whereas John Henry Wigmore (1863-1943) argued that legal evolution was more like complex gravitational interplay between planets. This theory can be used, in particular, to explain the interplay between different areas of the law or different legal systems. Similarly, legal memetics draws widely from biology and, as a subset of memetics, relies upon analogies between genes, evolutionary pressure, and the cultural transmission of ideas. Other theories are rooted in sociobiology, attempting to generalise from supposed universal features of humankind, or even from living creatures as a whole, to explain the development of legal rules, institutions, and ideas.

== History ==
=== Early-modern theories ===
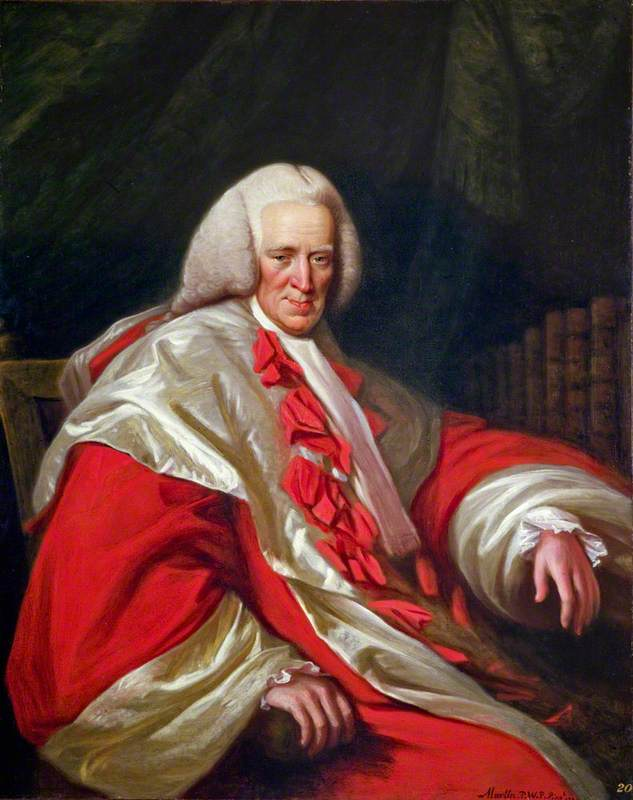
Lord Kames produced a theory of legal evolution based on four stages of development which every society passes through.

The idea of legal evolution first appears in the 18th century. Peter Stein argues that one of the main impetuses in its development was the inadequacy of theories of immemorial custom, popular heritage, sovereign will, and natural reason in explaining how legal systems change. Early examples include Pufendorf and Grotius who, despite their status as exemplars of natural law theorists, recognised that 'government and private property are not 'original' but appear only when man is ready for them'. They were followed by David Hume, who, as part of his argument against social contract theory, suggested law and government formed as a matter of habit over time. A French strand in evolutionary thinking developed simultaneously and was closely followed by the subsequent Scottish theorists. Montesquieu provided a highly detailed theory connecting law to society in 'The Spirit of the Laws', giving many specific examples of legal rules drawn from antiquity, contemporary law, and travel writers. However, he was unwilling to develop a general thesis of change, regarding it as unsubstantiated. Conversely, other French writers, such as Lafitau who compared Native Americans to the ancient Greeks, and Goguet, who traced economic and social effects on law, were willing to posit general theories of progress.

The Scottish philosophical school of history was more full-blooded in its adoption of legal evolution. John Dalrymple wrote 'An Essay towards a General Theory of Feudal Property in Great Britain' in 1759 which provided three stages of societal and legal development. These were, in ascending order of sophistication, hunting and fishing; pasturage and agriculture; and arts and industry. He linked these with the evolution of property, explaining in the first state that people would have at most a few moveable items of property whereas all immoveable property would be owned in common. Only with agricultural development would it be possible for land to be enclosed as property, and with crafts the development of more extensive forms of personal property. Lord Kames added a final stage, that of commerce produced by agricultural surplus, which explains the growth of contract law. Later Scottish writers include Adam Smith, who tied the four stages to political control of land in his Lectures in Jurisprudence, and John Millar, who sought a causal explanation for history focusing on factors such as soil, climate, population, and sophistication in crafts.

=== 19th-century theories ===
==== German Historical School ====
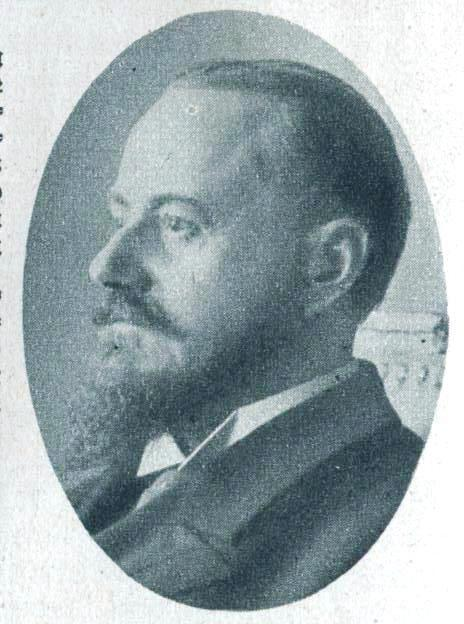
Karl Von Savigny proposed a cyclical theory of growth and decay to explain legal development.

The predominant theorist in the German Historical School developing an approach to legal evolution was Friedrich Karl von Savigny. Savigny combined Montesquieu's theory of the spirit of society; Edmund Burke's theory of political conservatism; Herder's concept of the nation as a cultural entity, individuated by its language and literature; and a historical approach. The result was a theory which linked the development of law to the particular character of a nation at a particular time. Savigny argued that 'in the earliest times to which authentic history extends, law will be found to have already attained a fixed character, peculiar to the people, like their language, manners and constitution.' His famous pamphlet, Of the vocation of Our Age for Legislation and Jurisprudence, used an organic metaphor to suggest law grows and withers away cyclically alongside the growth and decay of society, using the law of Rome as its paradigm. Savigny's theory served a political purpose as well, opposing attempts at legal codification and giving paramount authority to the jurists who would be responsible for developing the legal system.

Savigny was followed by Rudolf von Jhering, who examined the law of Rome and its connection to states of society closely. He criticised Savigny's theory of the character of the nation, suggesting it implied the presence of Roman influence in Germanic law was indefensible and had corrupted its natural evolution. However, he suggested this was not only impossible but undesirable - law was an 'intellectual organism' which was the product of numerous external influences. Jhering drew links between law and anatomy and physiology, preferring organic growth based on experience to 'mathematical jurisprudence' using a priori truth and deduction. His model of evolution also built on Savigny's by emphasising the role of lawyers in applying practical solutions to problems, giving more room to conscious development. Whereas early societies may develop law unconsciously like language, in progressive societies he proposed a functional approach giving a greater role to deliberate change.

==== English movement of legal evolution ====
The dominant view prior to the 19th century in England was that law was based on ancient custom, refined over centuries by practical reason. This view began to alter with influence from the German Historical School and social evolutionists, such as Auguste Comte. A clear indication of change is in the entry on law in the eighth edition of the Encyclopædia Britannica, authored by J.F. McLennan under influence from Savigny, Montesquieu, Smith, and Comte. It states: 'the fulness of the idea of law has not been reached by the whole of any system of laws now administered; but in the progress of civilisation the tendency everywhere is towards its realisation.' The peak of legal evolution in this period was the publishing of Maine's 'Ancient Law', which proposed an evolutionary theory of law. Maine argued that societies naturally progressed from 'status' based laws to a theory of independent contract, memorably summarised in the line 'from status to contract'.

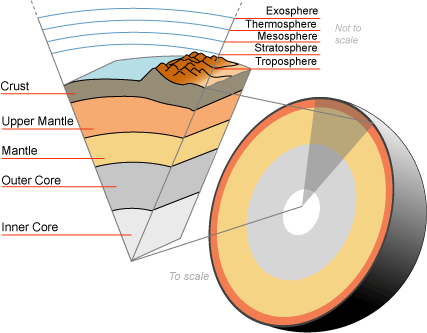
Ancient Law drew on Lyell's uniformitarian doctrine for its evolutionary theory.

In addition, he suggested there was an evolution in law-making practices. Initially, societies use legal fictions to disguise law making. They then move to broad discretion in the form of equity, and finally reaching the modern period, explicit law-making in the form of legislation. Maine also adopted a 'progressive development' theory which held contemporary 'noble' or 'progressive' nations were approaching the apotheosis of legal science achieved by Roman law. To show this, he adopted a comparative-historical approach focusing primarily on Indo-European comparisons, coupled with a geological scientific metaphor:

'If by any means we can determine the early forms of jural conceptions, they will be invaluable to us. These rudimentary ideas are to the jurist what the primary crusts of the earth are to the geologist. They contain, potentially, all the forms in which law has subsequently exhibited itself...The inquiries of the jurist are in truth prosecuted much as inquiry in physics and physiology was prosecuted before observation had taken the place of assumption.'

Ancient law was immensely popular in the Victorian period. Its attribution of continuous, impersonal natural laws to legal development was well matched to the great social and technological changes Britain was undergoing. Additionally, though likely completed before Origin of Species was published, Maine's work fitted with the vogue of Darwinian thinking. Nonetheless, despite its influence, Ancient law was criticised soon after being published for the inaccuracy of its historical material and anthropological commentary.

==== American doctrinal legal evolution ====
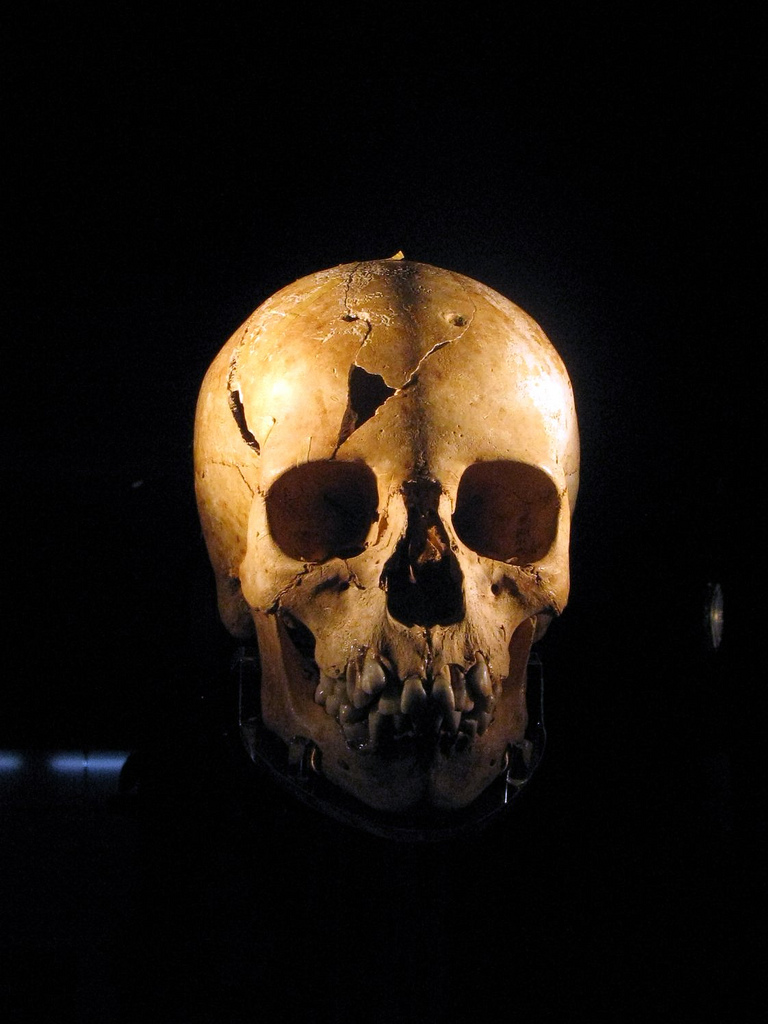
Maine suggested the difference between a Skull and vertebrae was equivalent to that of the modern executor and his prototype, the salesman of the Salic law.

Later American scholars were influenced by Maine's evolutionary view and applied it to the doctrinal evolution of the law. A notable early example is John Henry Wigmore who proposed a 'planetary model of legal evolution'. According to Wigmore, Maine and other prior writers were incorrect to suppose societies progressed mechanically through the same stages. Instead, legal evolution was more like the movement of planets, with different social and political forces producing tension and temporary equilibria. The result was unpredictable and chaotic due to differing and interdependent social and environmental interactions. Together with the professor of jurisprudence Albert Kocourek, Wigmore produced a 2100 word three volume anthology of collected works of legal evolution. These volumes contained a variety of views, ranging from a sociobiological explanation of property amongst animals, an economic approach explaining law's role in reducing intra-group conflict, to a sociological explanation connecting legal evolution to various social and cultural factors. These were taken up by Oliver Wendell Holmes Jr in his well-known book The Common Law, which outlined his view legal doctrine is necessitated by social circumstances. Holmes's theory was explicitly evolutionary, suggesting the development of specific legal doctrines could be analogised to the development of a cat's clavicle, and that doctrinal evolutions from one period could often be used in later ones for different purposes. Holmes was followed by Corbin, who took a similar view of legal evolution based on survival of the fittest.

=== Decline of legal evolution ===
Legal Evolution saw a continuous decline moving into the 20th century. Within England, the Russian historian of English Law Sir Paul Vinogradoff attempted to defend Maine and, under the influence of Adam Smith, produced a six-stage model of legal evolution. However, as he admitted himself, his theory could not capture all legal systems, and its pretensions of universality were replaced with an argument of 'historical types'. This coincided with a split between comparative and historical methodology. The focus on legal types meant the abandonment of any progressive thesis; by 1920 theories of legal evolution were replaced by national historical analysis and the occasional comparison with foreign jurisdiction. Few attempts at legal evolution occurred after this period, with a few exceptions in the form of reprints. Stein suggests that a primary cause of this decline was the lack of optimism in progressive theories of society following the first world war; the abandonment of the idea physics and natural science can be applied directly to social phenomena; and a greater concentration on the development, idiosyncrasies, and history of particular societies.

== Contemporary Theories ==
=== Law and economics ===
The Law and economics movement has been treated by some scholars as a continuation of earlier theories of legal evolution. Developed in the middle of the 20th Century, Law and economics theorists seek to apply the methods of economic analysis to law. Elliott argues that the Law and economics movement claims to have solved the puzzle of why some legal rules survive and develop whereas others are rejected via classical economics. For instance, Clark used 'cost-reduction' to explain the force behind legal evolution in statute. Influential early law and economics scholars taking this approach include Richard Posner, Paul Rubin, and George L. Priest.

=== Luhmannian Systems Theory ===
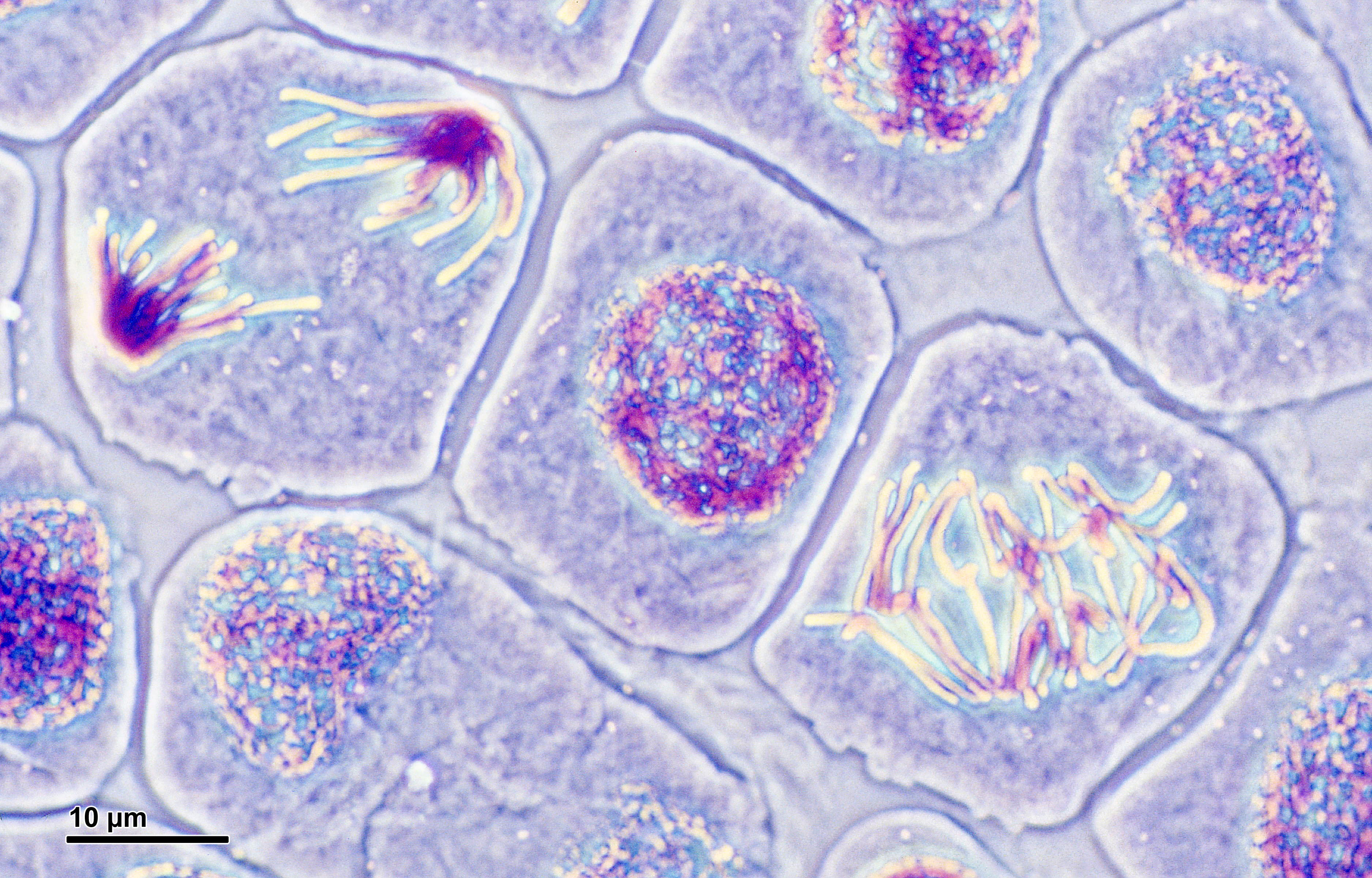
Teubner analogises legal development to the response of biological cells to external stimuli.

A highly influential theory of legal evolution has been the application of Niklas Luhmann's model of systems theory to law. David Ibbetson suggests that 'at its core, Luhmann and Teubner argue one of the distinctive contributions of law is to manage complexity'. The world is a complex and unpredictable place; the role of law is to impose order and produce stable expectations for adjudicative outcomes. Law achieves this goal by creating conditional programmes containing constraints on the relevant material taken into account. For example, in tort law, a lawyer only has to focus on a relatively narrow range of factors to work out whether someone is liable to pay damages. This may result in simplification, but it is a price we accept in order to avoid greater disorder. Luhmann also provides a theory of change: although the law is self-referential (autopoietic) it must respond to external developments in society and as such will interact with other social systems. What systems theory suggests is that although legal rules will alter to match society, changes occur only after a delay. In his earlier work, Luhmann provided a clear evolutionary thesis, suggesting that increasing complexity in modern society has led to the development of a positivistic view of law in the place of the unity of law and morality. In order for law to manage increasing possibilities, Luhmann suggested it had to develop a mode for the rapid alteration of legal rules separately from moral norms, and a higher-level of abstraction in legal concepts to cover more diverse possible scenarios.

Teubner has developed this process in more detail, analogising legal systems to biological cells. Cells have an internal structure, but will react to the environment via self-contained processes. Teubner accepts the law changes and responds to independent events, but only according to its own pace. Nonetheless, legal change is not entirely automatic - it acts in a purposive manner, justice serving as the ultimate programme. The law seeks to align with external demands of justice and remain consistent; Teubner summarises this dichotomy succinctly: 'internal consistency plus responsiveness to ecological demands - this is the double requirement of juridical justice'. A closely connected theory to systems theory is the notion of path dependence, where developments in one particular legal form can determine subsequent development.

=== Legal Memetics ===
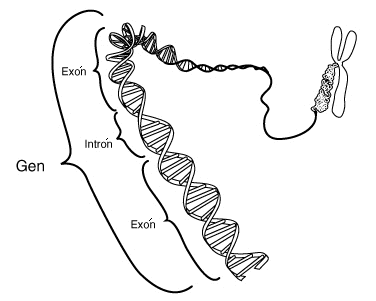
Legal memetics suggest legal concepts encode data about the environment like genes.

One of the most recent developments in legal evolution has been the application of memetics to law. Memetics provides a model for the cultural transmission of information by using a genetic metaphor related to the movement and alteration of genes. As Simon Deakin notes, memetics supposes 'patterns of cultural evolution are closely analogous to those which occur in the natural world as a result of the interaction between genes, organisms, and environments.' Deakin provides a theory of legal memetics resting on three theses. First, that legal change is cumulative and successive changes can give rise to 'complex, multi-functional legal institutions'. Second, that legal systems are adaptive though do not optimise to become more efficient. They are constrained by history without tending towards an optimal state. Third, he argues legal concepts act like genes, encoding information about society and the world, and are passed down in a manner analogous to genetic inheritance. According to legal memetics, legal forms, like biological adaption, often outlive their initial purposes and can be adopted later in different contexts. This can lead to 'lock in', a form of path dependence, where a particular legal innovation has a long-lasting influence by increasing the cost of switching to a different legal model. In a similar manner, biological adaptation often involves the repurposing of prior adaptations which can constrain possible future routes. These kinds of phenomena are extremely common in legal systems and suggest legal concepts contain information about the prior environments which have shaped them.

Other factors which influence the memetic success of a legal concept are its institutional authority, such as being cited in multiple precedents; its adaptability; and its ease of memorisation and replication. For example, Erika Chamberlain suggests the neighbour principle in Donoghue vs Stevenson may have been successful as a self-propagating meme partially because of the case's memorable facts, Lord Atkin's rhetorical devices, and narrative structure.
