= Kabyle law =

Legal system of the Kabyle people

Kabyle law is the law practiced historically and specifically by the Kabyle people in Algeria. Although elements of Kabyle law existed prior to French colonial rule in Algeria, Kabyle law codes have been long rejected as colonial inventions.

== History ==
Kabyle law was essentially transmitted orally, with its sources being customs and practices (general or local, village-based) and the Quran, which governs civil law only in areas where custom does not apply. Similar customary systems, where Berber custom blends with Islamic rules, also exist in the Aurès Mountains and among the Tuareg.

Kabyle law was intensively studied and documented by the French during the colonization of Algeria, with the aim of understanding the society and providing a legal framework for the colony. Kabyle law has even been wrongly accused of being a colonial construct. Pierre Bourdieu, in particular, articulated such a critique. Colonization, on the contrary, attempted to standardize the law applied locally by replacing, for certain civil matters, the rule of Islamic law, and then that of the French Civil Code. According to Judith Scheele, this presentation of Kabyle law is reductive, failing to take into account its continued importance in Kabylia today, and the ability of villages to maintain their role in enacting rules after the colonial period and since independence under a centralized and Jacobin Algerian state. The notions of the special status of Kabyle village spaces persist, as do local tendencies to promulgate laws, whether or not they are respected.

== Lqanun ==
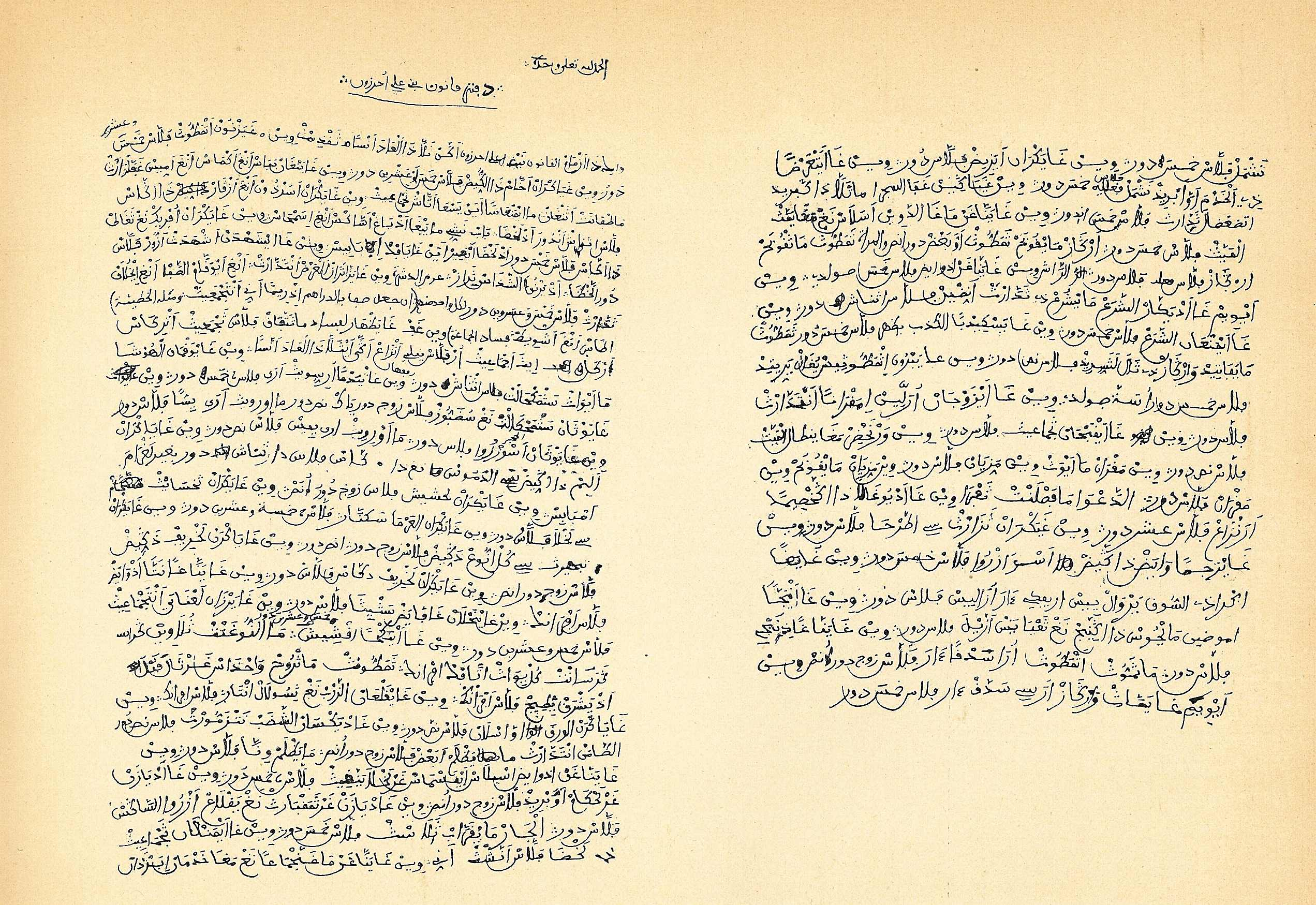
Manuscript of the qanun (customary law) of the Ait Ali or Herzun, manuscript in Kabyle language transcribed in Berber Arabic alphabet (19th century).

The qanun, in Tamazight: lqanun or azref (the law) are collections of laws specific to each village. The term qanun is of Greco-Latin origin, having passed through Arabic as its morphology indicates.

Customary law regulations in Kabylia were not limited to criminal matters, but also governed personal status, inheritance, and economic contracts, particularly those of agricultural partnerships. The most frequent sanction for social offenses was a fine, applied for infractions such as uncleanliness of the village, theft, or violence, with the exception of murder. The penalties were often very detailed. Serious offenses, such as attacks on the sanctity of the village (in Tamazight: lḥerma n taddart), were punished by severe penalties such as the burning or demolition of houses, ostracism, or banishment. Camille Sabatier, a colonist theorist of "Berber separatism" and racist, claimed that the qanuns (customary laws) of the Kabyles came from someone who was "not of the family of Mohamed and Moses but of that of Montesquieu and Condorcet."

=== Women's rights ===
Kabyle customary law imposed severe restrictions on women that exceeded those found in Islamic law. Under these customs, women inherited nothing from parents, siblings, or husbands. Marriage arrangements treated the bride price as the property of a woman's father or male guardian. In cases of divorce or repudiation, women received no compensation, faced barriers to remarriage without indemnity payments to the former husband, and held no custody rights over children beyond infancy, with offspring typically absorbed into the father's kin group. Georges-Henri Bousquet found that Kabyle law subjected women to the "strictest surveillance," noting that the position of women in Kabylia was inferior to that of women in other Berber areas.

== Tajmaât ==
The Tajmâat, in Tamazight: ⵜⴰⵊⵎⴰⵄⵜ (tajmaεt), is the assembly of a village or tribe. Composed solely of men, it is a Berber structure existing in other Berber-speaking areas (Mzab, Aurès, Middle Atlas, etc.). It establishes regulations (qanun), organizes public works, and ensures the resolution of disputes.

=== Political role ===
The tajmaât is composed of people fulfilling various roles, including the president amin, the imam (known as marabout), representatives, and the herald aberrah. It is financed by fines levied when an offense is committed. One of its main roles is to organize the various annual village festivals.

=== Jurisdictional role ===
The tajmaât is also responsible for administering justice by applying the 'arf which contains various rules of procedure and substance.

== Bibliographie ==
- Laidani, Amar (2021). Le droit coutumier kabyle pendant la colonisation française. Institut des usages. Presses universitaires de Montpellier ; Université Laval (Québec, Canada).
- Gahlouz, Mustapha (2011). Les qanouns kabyles: anthropologie juridique du groupement social villageois de Kabylie. Tira-langues, littératures et civilisations berbères. Paris Budapest Torino: l'Harmattan. ISBN 978-2-296-56042-0.
- Assam, Malika (2017-06-15). "Les « règlements intérieurs » de village en Kabylie : entre maintien d'un droit coutumier et dynamiques nouvelles des communautés villageoises". Revue des mondes musulmans et de la Méditerranée (141): –141, p.235–258. doi:10.4000/remmm.9950. ISSN 0997-1327.
- Scheele, Judith (2008). "A Taste for Law: Rule-Making in Kabylia (Algeria)". Comparative Studies in Society and History. 50 (4): 895–919. ISSN 0010-4175. JSTOR 27563712.
- Judith Scheele (2014-01-01). "Community as an Achievement: Kabyle Customary Law and Beyond". Legalism: Community and Justice.
- Gahlouz, Mustapha (2021-05-01). "Customary law 2. The Kabyles". Encyclopaedia of Islam, THREE. Brill.
- Gahlouz, Mustapha (2010-12-01). "Droit coutumier et régulation dans la société kabyle de la fin du XIXe siècle". Droit et cultures. Revue internationale interdisciplinaire (60): 177–209. doi:10.4000/droitcultures.2359. ISSN 0247-9788.
- Mahmoud, Djadda (2016-12-14). "La Juridiction traditionnelle et contexte en Kabylie du 19e siècle". Cahiers de sociologie. 4 (2): 02–27. ISSN 2830-8174.
