= Marie Seong-Hak Kim =

South Korean legal historian (born 1958)

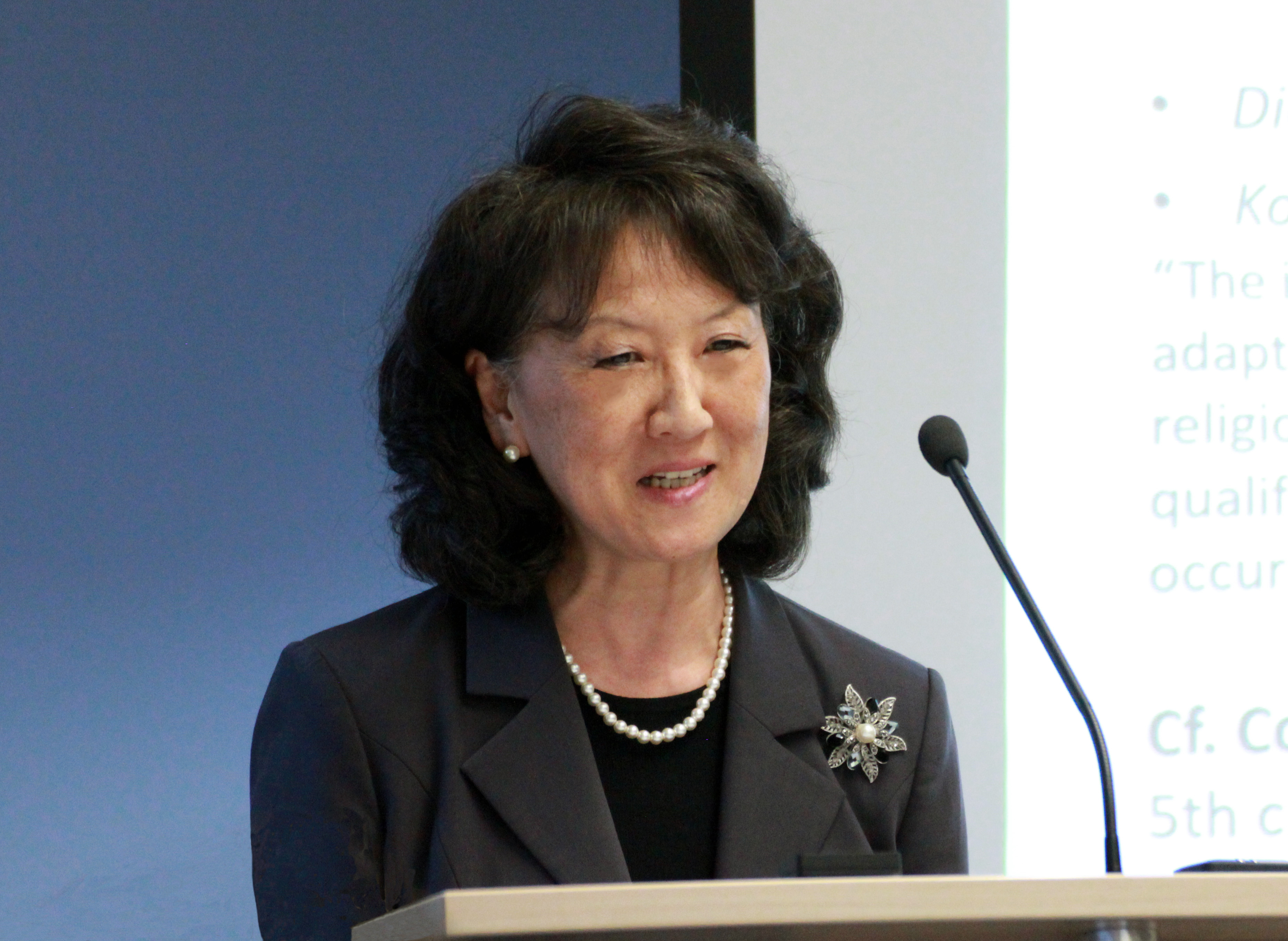
- Born: Kim Seong-Hak (김성학); 1958 (age 67–68); Seoul, South Korea

Academic background
- Education: Ewha Woman's University (BA, MA); University of Minnesota (PhD); University of Minnesota Law School (JD)
- Doctoral advisor: James D. Tracy and Paul W. Bamford

Academic work
- Discipline: Legal history
- Sub-discipline: Comparative Legal History; Asia; Europe; Early Modern France
- Main interests: Comparative Legal History

Marie Seong-Hak Kim (Korean: 김성학; born 1958) is a historian and jurist. She is known for her work of comparing European and East Asian legal history, with emphasis on the sources of law, legal theories, and court practices.

== Early life and education ==
Kim was born in Seoul, South Korea. Her father, Kim Yun-haeng, was a justice of the Supreme Court of Korea from 1973 through 1980. She graduated from Ewha Woman's University in Seoul. She received her Ph.D. from the University of Minnesota, where she worked under Paul W. Bamford and James D. Tracy. She also earned her J.D. from the University of Minnesota Law School.

== Scholarship ==
Kim's Law and Custom in Korea: Comparative Legal History (2012) was the first study that comprehensively examined Korean legal history in comparison with European legal history, with particular focus on customary law. A reviewer remarked that the book was far more than a presentation on Korean law and that it instead provided a “more general reflection on the development of customary law in the colonial context”. It demonstrated, as observed by another reviewer, that “there is more than one way of approaching the role of law in the construction of empire (and of empire in the construction of law)”. Her book revised the dominant view in historiography that premodern Korea had a system of private law in the form of customary law. Kim credited Jérôme Bourgon's work in Chinese law for this insight. She has argued that the concept of custom in the legal meaning of the term in East Asia was constructed by the Meiji legal elites in the late nineteenth and early twentieth centuries as they tried to facilitate the transplant of European civil law to Japan. This imported notion of custom as law spread to China and Korea, serving as an intermediary regime between tradition and the demands of modern civil law. Japanese law had profound influence throughout East Asia, in particular in Korea which was a Japanese colony (1910 – 1945).

Kim's Constitutional Transition and the Travail of Judges: The Courts of South Korea (2019) was a study of the evolution of the judicial process and jurisprudence in modern South Korea, seen against the backdrop of the country's political and constitutional vicissitudes. This work was also comparative in its core, contextualizing constitutional authoritarianism in the twentieth century, including Weimar Germany and Latin America. Her investigation into and interpretation of judicial travails in the 1970s under the Yusin Constitution brought “the South Korean case into the general discussions of authoritarian legalism and of transitional justice taking place around the world”.

In her latest book, Custom, Law, and Monarchy: A Legal History of Early Modern France (2021), she returned to her earlier research interest in the French ancien régime. Originally trained as a sixteenth-century French historian she published her first book in 1997 on Michel de L’Hôpital, chancellor of France from 1560 through 1568 during the French Religious Wars. Her 2010 article on L’Hôpital and early modern French law was the subject of a LHR Forum in Law and History Review. Custom, Law, and Monarchy deals with “the history of the redaction of French customs from the middle of the fifteenth century until the abolition of customary law in 1789, set against on the one hand the development of royal absolutism and on the other, scholarly debate about the true source of law.” Kim “placed private law in relation to public law and explored the spirit of traditional law in connection with fundamental laws, politics, and the formation of the French legal model in competition with the Roman model.” This book “demonstrates the powerful convergence between political requirement and legal logic” and “shows that one of the primary characteristics of law is to adapt, to constantly transform itself to meet the ever-changing needs of social and political life.” Kim's stated goal for writing this book was “to bridge the divides among l’histoire, l’histoire du droit, and le droit.” She thus provided “a series of carefully documented case studies of the processes involved as the lawyers grappled with thorny issues such as property rights, marriage and inheritance, outlining the successes, and often setbacks the monarchy and its servants faced when trying to bring ‘efficiency and unity into the kingdom’s laws’.” Notably, she “takes into account the weight of financial and social constraints, which is not so common for a legal historian,” and "weaves a historiographical account of the ways in which French historians and lawyers have treated and understood their law.”

A central conceptual framework in her research is the role of customary law in the formation of modern states. "Kim relies on H. Patrick Glenn's (1920–2014) evolutionary stages of custom in Europe: capture, reconstruction and marginalisation” and has applied them to her analysis of East Asian law, showing “how a comparative legal historical approach can be executed in a fruitful manner and, moreover, how it can help to cross not only the confines of time and space but also the confines of legal cultures." She has argued that the codification of customs was a recurring pattern in the process of receiving outside law, as witnessed across history from medieval France (receiving Roman law) to Meiji Japan (embracing European civil law) to colonial scenes (transplanting metropolitan law). Of late, she has written on the South Korea-Japan relations surrounding colonial compensation.

Kim's political and jurisprudential approach to law has been contrasted to that of more culturally attuned historians. Described as “primarily a lawyer's history”, her writings focusing on politics and state legal institutions. Her scholarship has been noted as “a comparative law study that is unique for its kind to date.” Alan Watson stated in 2012 that Kim's book, Law and Custom in Korea, “is the best law book I have read in several years.”

== Fellowships and grants ==
She was a Fellow at several research institutes in Europe, including the Collegium de Lyon (2011–2012), the Netherlands Institute for Advanced Study (2013–2014), the Freiburg Institute for Advanced Studies (EURIAS and Marie Curie Fellow of the European Union) (2016–2017), Käte Hamburger Kolleg "Recht als Kultur" at the University of Bonn (2019), and Käte Hamburger Kolleg “Einheit und Vielfalt im Recht” at the University of Münster (2023–2024). She is the recipient of the Fulbright Senior Scholar Grant, the National Endowment for the Humanities Fellowship, and the Social Science Research Council Abe Fellowship.

== Personal life ==
Kim lives in Minneapolis, Minnesota. She is married and has two sons. She is a member of the Minnesota Bar.

== Works ==
=== Monographs ===
- Custom, Law, and Monarchy: A Legal History of Early Modern France (Oxford: Oxford University Press, 2021, 304 pages). ISBN 9780192845498
- Constitutional Transition and the Travail of Judges: The Courts of South Korea (Cambridge: Cambridge University Press, 2019, 388 pages). ISBN 9781108474894
- Law and Custom in Korea: Comparative Legal History (Cambridge: Cambridge University Press, 2012, 384 pages). ISBN 9781107006973
- Kwansŭppŏp: Hanguk kŭnhyŏndaesa wa pigyopŏp yŏngu (관습법: 한국 근현대사와 비교법 연구) [Customary Law: Modern and Contemporary History of Korea and Comparative Law] (Seoul: Minsokwon, 2025, 504 pages). ISBN 9788928521043. Korean Translation of Law and Custom in Korea: Comparative Legal History (Cambridge University Press 2012).
- Michel de L'Hôpital: the Vision of a Reformist Chancellor during the French Religious Wars (Kirksville: Truman State University Press, Sixteenth Century Essays & Studies, vol. 36, 1997, 216 pages). ISBN 0940474387

=== Edited volume ===
- The Spirit of Korean Law: Korean Legal History in Context (Leiden: Brill | Nijhoff, 2016, 279 pages). ISBN 9789004290778
