= Legal reception =

Theoretical legal concept

In legal theory, reception refers to the process by which one legal system borrows individual rules, institutions or even whole areas of law from another and implements them as its own. Often, the state where the reception occurs also adopts the particular style or methodology of the system which served as the model. The phenomenon is almost ubiquitous in legal history and has been described using a variety of terms, including "legal transplants", "diffusion", "legal transfer", "influence", "inspiration", "export" and "cross-fertilization".

== Scope of reception ==
Reception is not confined to the adoption of foreign statutory law; it may also consist of the adoption of foreign case law, although such borrowings tend to be less evident. Indeed, the process of reception may range from the adoption of individual concepts or institutions to the wholesale adoption of entire legal codes.

At one end of the spectrum, the absorption of the business judgment rule into German company law illustrates a narrow, targeted reception. At the other end, the complete adoption by Turkey of the Swiss Civil Code (ZGB) and the Swiss Code of Obligations (OR) in 1926 represents a full reception. Between these extremes lies the inspirational influence exerted by codes such as the French Code civil and the German Bürgerliches Gesetzbuch (BGB) on numerous European and non-European legal systems, where reception is neither a word-for-word translation nor restricted to the one-off adoption of individual rules.

== 'Doctrine of reception' in common law ==
In common law, the doctrine of reception (properly, reception of the common law of England in a colony) refers to the process in which English law becomes applicable to a British Crown Colony, or protectorate.

In Commentaries on the Laws of England (Bk I, ch.4, pp 106–108), Sir William Blackstone described the doctrine as follows:

Plantations or colonies, in distant countries, are either such where the lands are claimed by right of occupancy only, by finding them desert and uncultivated, and peopling them from the mother-country; or where, when already cultivated, they have been either gained by conquest, or ceded to us by treaties. And both these rights are founded upon the law of nature, or at least upon that of nations. But there is a difference between these two species of colonies, with respect to the laws by which they are bound. For it hath been held, that if an uninhabited country be discovered and planted by English subjects, all the English laws then in being, which are the birthright of every subject, are immediately there in force... But in conquered or ceded countries, that have already laws of their own, the king may indeed alter and change those laws; but, till he does actually change them, the ancient laws of the country remain, unless such as are against the law of God, as in the case of an infidel country.

(Note: the 'infidel country' reference here was mainly intended to prohibit customs considered barbaric by the British, such as cannibalism, once a territory was colonized, in an age when communications between the British government and her far-flung colonies could take months on end.)

In other words, if an 'uninhabited' territory is colonised by Britain, then the English law automatically applies in this territory from the moment of colonisation; however if the colonised territory has a pre-existing legal system, the native law would apply (effectively a form of indirect rule) until formally superseded by the English law, through Royal Prerogative subjected to the Westminster Parliament.

Further examples of reception in common law systems include the reception statutes passed in the federal states of the United States which authorised the application of English law post-independence, and the spreading of colonial powers' legal traditions in subjected territories by means of imposition.

== Specific examples ==
=== Reception of Roman law in Europe ===
The reception of Roman law in Europe is the most prominently discussed reception process in academic literature. After the rediscovery of the Corpus Juris Civilis, medieval glossators and commentators interpreted and expanded upon it, and together with canon law it became a subject of research and teaching at universities across Europe. The reception was not imposed by statute but occurred gradually over several centuries, as lawyers educated at Italian universities became judges, officials and advocates, importing the principles and methods of Romano-canon law (the ius commune) into their home countries. There, Roman law was amalgamated with locally applicable written or customary law, filling gaps, providing systematic structure, and offering a basis for legitimacy where local law was uncertain or fragmented.

The extent of reception varied significantly between jurisdictions. In Germany, where traditional law was highly fragmented and no centralised courts or legal profession existed comparable to those in England or France, Roman law filled a vacuum and its influence was greatest. In England, the strength of the Inns of Court, the centralised royal courts and an established legal profession limited Roman law's practical impact despite its presence at universities. In France, the Germanic coutumes of the north and the influence of powerful courts and advocates prevented complete reception, though Roman law remained significant especially in the south.

=== Hong Kong ===
In practice, it could take years or even decades for the native law in a colony to be gradually superseded by English law. The legal history of Hong Kong provides an illustration: after colonisation by the British Empire in 1841, the Great Qing Legal Code remained in force for the local Chinese population. Until the end of the 19th century, Chinese offenders were still executed by decapitation, whereas the British would be put to death by hanging. Even deep into the 20th century and well after the fall of the Qing dynasty in China, Chinese men in Hong Kong could still practise polygamy by virtue of the Qing Code—a situation ended only with the passing of the Marriage Act of 1971.

=== Türkiye ===
In 1926, Türkiye undertook a full reception by adopting the Swiss Civil Code (ZGB) and Swiss Code of Obligations (OR) virtually word for word, producing the Turkish Civil Code and Turkish Code of Obligations. However, although the codes were framed as a revolutionary break, they continued to reflect many established beliefs, norms and laws. Complete identification with Swiss law in action has still not been achieved, particularly in the tradition-oriented areas of family law and the law of succession.

== Academic analysis ==
=== Legal transplantation ===
The Scottish legal scholar Alan Watson coined the term "legal transplants" to refer to the process whereby a legal phenomenon transfers from one legal system to another. He demonstrated through analysis of Roman law how extensively its concepts have become engrained in various legal systems—including some systems not ordinarily counted among those influenced by Roman law. Watson argued that legal transplants are the most common driver of legal change throughout history, and that laws can move freely between societies even when their internal socio-political conditions are very different.

=== Voluntary and imposed reception ===
==== Voluntary legal reception ====
According to Max Rheinstein, "reception" should preferably be reserved for those situations in which legal phenomena of one legal climate are consciously and willingly adopted into another legal system. He identified two categories of voluntary legal reception:

- Legal necessity reception: where there is an apparent need for a change of legal system in one culture and another existing culture provides an opportunity to satisfy the need.
- Legal veneration reception: which occurs if alien norms, institutes or a whole system is adopted for their venerated position and prestige of cultural background.

==== Imposed legal reception ====
If a legal phenomenon is imposed upon another nation by force, this is referred to as imposed legal reception. In few instances, under certain conditions, imposed reception may transform into a voluntary process and thus become genuine reception, but usually an imposed legal phenomenon would not be considered genuine legal reception.

== See also ==
- Comparative law
- Legal transplant
- Propagation of the common law to the colonies
- Reception statute in former British colonies
- Roman law
- Terra nullius
