= Caroline Humfress =

Caroline Humfress FBA FRHistS
- Born: 1971 (age 54–55)

Academic background
- Education: University of Cambridge
- Thesis: Forensic practice in the development of Roman law and ecclesiastical law in late antiquity, with special reference to the prosecution of heresy (1999)

Academic work
- Discipline: History
- Sub-discipline: Legal history; comparative legal history; Late antiquity; medieval history; Roman law; history of Christianity
- Institutions: University of Oxford; University of California, Berkeley; Birkbeck, University of London; University of St Andrews; University of Michigan Law School

Caroline Humfress, FBA, FRHistS (born 1971) is a British historian and academic, specialising in legal history. She is Professor of Medieval History at the University of St Andrews, and a co-director of its Institute of Legal and Constitutional Research.

== Early life and education ==
Caroline Humfress was born in 1971 in Ashington, Northumberland, England. She was educated at Queen Elizabeth High School, an upper school in Hexham. She studied the history tripos at Queens' College, Cambridge, graduating with a double starred first class Bachelor of Arts (BA) degree; as per tradition, her BA was promoted to a Master of Arts (MA Cantab) degree. She remained at the University of Cambridge from to undertake a Doctor of Philosophy (PhD) degree in its Faculty of History. As a postgraduate student, she was a member of St John's College, Cambridge. Her doctoral thesis was titled Forensic practice in the development of Roman and ecclesiastical law in late antiquity, with special reference to the prosecution of heresy (1999).

== Academic career ==
Humfress held a junior research fellowship at Queens' College, Cambridge, before moving in 1995 to become "Carlyle Research Fellow in the History of Political Thought" at St Catherine's College, University of Oxford. She was assistant professor in rhetoric and Law at the University of California, Berkeley, from 2000 to 2005. She then returned to the United Kingdom, joining to Birkbeck College, University of London, as a senior lecturer. She became Professor of History in 2014.

In July 2015, she joined the University of St Andrews, having been appointed Professor of Medieval History and deputy director of its Institute of Legal and Constitutional Research. In 2019/20 she became Director of the Institute of Legal and Constitutional Research. Since 2025, she has been Bishop Wardlaw Professor of Medieval History. In 2020, she was additionally appointed L. Bates Lea Global Professor of Law, University of Michigan Law School (Ann Arbor), where she teaches on the history of the Civil Law tradition.

Humfress was elected Fellow of the Royal Historical Society (FRHistS) in 2006. She was elected Fellow of the British Academy (FBA) in 2025. She is also a fellow of The Society of Legal Scholars and the Ecclesiastical History Society.

== Selected publications ==
- Humfress, Caroline, Ibbetson, David and Olivelle, Patrick, eds., (2024) Cambridge Comparative History of Ancient Law (Cambridge and New York: Cambridge University Press).
- Humfress, Caroline (2024). ‘Legal Pluralism’s Other: Mythologizing Modern Law” Law and History Review 42.1 (at press), First View (Open access): https://doi.org/10.1017/S07382480230001
- Humfress, Caroline (2023). ‘Out of Time? Eternity, Christology and Justinianic Law’ in John Robertson, ed., Political Thought, Time, And History (Cambridge and New York: Cambridge University Press), 36 - 53 doi:10.1017/9781009289399.002
- Humfress, Caroline (2022). ‘The Early Church’ in Anders Winroth and John Wei, eds., The Cambridge Companion to Medieval Canon Law (Cambridge and New York: Cambridge University Press), 11 - 31 doi:10.1017/9781139177221.002
- Humfress, Caroline (2021). ‘Beyond the (Byzantine) State: Towards a User Theory of Jurisdiction’ in Nico Krisch, ed.,Entangled Legalities Beyond the State (Cambridge: Cambridge University Press), 353 - 375 doi:10.1017/9781108914642.018
- Humfress, Caroline (2021). ‘Law, Bureaucracy, and the Practice of Government and Rule’ in Peter Bang, Christopher Bayly, and Walter Scheidel, eds., The Oxford World History of Empire (Oxford: Oxford University Press), 266 - 287 ISBN 9780199772360
- Humfress, Caroline (2021). ‘Natural Law and Casuistic Reasoning in Roman Jurisprudence’ in Peter Adamson and Christoff Rapp, eds., State and Nature: Essays on Ancient Political Philosophy (Berlin: De Gruyter), 247 - 266 https://doi.org/10.1515/9783110730944-012
- Humfress, Caroline (2020). ‘ “Cherchez La Femme!” Heresy and Law in Late Antiquity' in Rosamond McKitterick, Charlotte Methuen and Andrew Spicer, eds., The Church and the Law. Studies in Church History Volume 56 (Cambridge, Cambridge University Press) doi:10.1017/stc.2019.3
- Humfress, Caroline (2018). ’A New Legal Cosmos: Late Roman Lawyers and the Early Medieval Church', The Medieval World, Linehan, P., Nelson, J. L. & Costambeys, M. (eds.) (London: Routledge) Print ISBN 9781138848689
- Humfress, Caroline (2016). "Ordering divine knowledge in late Roman legal discourse - University of St Andrews". COLLeGIUM. 20: 160–176. OCLC 948926293.
- Humfress, Caroline (2015). "Telling Stories about (Roman) Law: Rules and Concepts in Legal Discourse". In Dresch, Paul and Judith Scheele (ed.). Legalism: Rules and Categories. Oxford University Press. pp. 79–104. ISBN 9780198753810.
- Humfress, Caroline (2015), "Patristic Sources", in Johnston, David (ed.), The Cambridge companion to Roman law, Cambridge University Press, pp. 97–118, ISBN 978-0521719940
- Harrison, Carol; Humfress, Caroline; Sandwell, Isabella; Clark, Gillian (2014), Being Christian in late antiquity : a festschrift for Gillian Clark, Oxford, United Kingdom, ISBN 978-0199656035
- Duindam, Jeroen; Harries, Jill Diana; Humfress, Caroline; Nimrod, Hurvitz (2013), Law and empire : ideas, practices, actors, Rulers & elites, v. 3., Brill, ISBN 9781299829541
- Humfress, Caroline (2007), Orthodoxy and the courts in late antiquity, Oxford, ISBN 978-0198208419
- Garnsey, Peter; Humfress, Caroline (2001), The evolution of the late antique world, Orchard Academic, ISBN 9781903283004
