= Lycée Fustel de Coulanges =

Lycée Fustel de Coulanges may refer to:

- Lycée Fustel-de-Coulanges (Strasbourg) (France)
- Lycée Français Fustel de Coulanges (Yaoundé, Cameroon)
