= Uri Yiftach =

Israeli papyrologist

- Born: September 12, 1967 (age 59); Israel
- Citizenship: Israeli

Academic background
- Education: Tel Aviv University
- Doctoral advisor: Ze’ev Rubin, Ranon Katzoff

Academic work
- Discipline: Papyrology, Ancient Law, Classical studies
- Institutions: Tel Aviv University
- Notable works: The Taxonomy of the Legal Document (2025)

Uri Yiftach (Hebrew: אורי יפתח; born September 12, 1967) is an Israeli papyrologist and scholar of ancient law. He is a full professor in the Department of Classical Studies at Tel Aviv University, where he served as the Head of the Department between July 2022 and February 2026. His research focuses on the legal, social, and administrative history of Egypt during the Hellenistic, Roman, and Byzantine periods, primarily through the study of Greek documentary papyri.

== Biography ==
Yiftach was born in Israel on September 12, 1967. He served in the IDF between 1986 and 1989. He earned his Bachelor of Arts from Tel Aviv University in 1992 and completed his Ph.D. in the Department of History at the same institution in 2001. His doctoral dissertation, titled Marriage and Marital Arrangements: A History of the Greek Marriage Document in Egypt, explored the evolution of marital documentation from the 4th century BCE to the 4th century CE.

In 2000–2001, he was a post-doctoral fellow at Columbia University under the mentorship of Roger S. Bagnall. Subsequently, he served as a Golda Meir Fellow at the Hebrew University of Jerusalem.

In 2007–2008, Yiftach was a fellow researcher at The Center for Hellenic studies.

== Academic career ==
Yiftach taught at the Hebrew University of Jerusalem from 2003 to 2014, where he also served as the Head of the Department of Classics (2013–2014). In 2014, he joined Tel Aviv University as an associate professor. In 2022, Yiftach became the Head of the Department of Classical Studies, Tel Aviv University. He was promoted to a full professor in 2023.

Yiftach is a recipient of the Alexander von Humboldt Research Fellowship, and a fellow at the Käte Hamburger Kolleg "Legal Unity and Pluralism" (EViR) at the University of Münster, from March till August 2026.

Yiftach also studied the academic careers and fate of German scholars of Jewish descent. This line of work culminated in a conference marking the centenary of Michael Schnebel's Die Landwirtschaft im hellenistischen Ägypten. 1. Band: Der Betrieb der Landwirtschaft, with contributions by Walter Otto and Franz Pluhatsch (Münchener Beiträge zur Papyrusforschung und antiken Rechtsgeschichte 7).The related DAI conference, titled Michael Schnebel (1867–1938), die Münchner Papyrologie und die Landwirtschaft im griechischrömisch-spätantiken Ägypten: Tradition und neue Perspektiven, was held in Munich on 18–19 July 2025.

== Research and academic work ==
Yiftach's work centers on the analysis of documentary papyri, which were composed to record everyday activities rather than for literary purposes. His research explores several key areas:

- Legal Documents and Contracts: Yiftach's research centers on the taxonomy of Greek legal documents, with particular emphasis on the language, syntax, and historical development of contractual clauses in Ptolemaic, Roman, and Byzantine Egypt. In The Taxonomy of the Legal Document, he presents a long-term study of Greek legal documents on papyrus, including a clause-by-clause analysis of 281 contractual formulations, mostly from Egypt, from the early Hellenistic to the late Byzantine period. The work is based on the Synallagma database, a digital corpus first created with the support of the Israel Science Foundation and now hosted at the University of Münster, and combines philological, quantitative, and comparative analysis to examine how scribes encoded rights, duties, and transfers of ownership in legal language.
- Administrative Documentation: Yiftach has studied the formal conventions of administrative reports and the role of documentary terminology in the functioning of Roman imperial rule. His research explores how reports, classifications, and administrative language organized information and helped sustain provincial government. In parallel, he developed this field further through the German-Israeli Foundation project Synopsis: Data Processing and State Management in Roman Egypt (30 BCE–300 CE), carried out with Andrea Jördens, which examined the handling of reports, accounts, and bookkeeping within the administrative machinery of Roman Egypt.
- Cross-Cultural Legal Dialogue: Yiftach's work examines the reciprocal influence of Greek, Egyptian, and Roman legal traditions, with particular attention to the processes of Hellenization, fusion, and Romanization in Graeco-Roman Egypt. He has also contributed to the comparative framework of Legal Documents in Ancient Societies, an international research group devoted to the study of legal and administrative systems in the ancient world through documentary evidence.
- Digital Humanities and Computational Linguistics: Yiftach's recent work integrates digital humanities. He is involved in developing "Cog/PLACTAC," an object-centered annotation framework for scientific and technical texts. This initiative aims to create gold-standard training data from classical authors such as Varro, Theophrastus, Aristotle, and Pliny, enabling downstream AI-based modeling.

In addition to co-founding the international research group Legal Documents in Ancient Societies (LDAS) in 2007, Yiftach has organized further collaborative networks on documentary practice. These include "elenchus instrumentorum" and "BotAgrPap," a newer initiative focused on agronomic and botanical evidence across documentary and literary sources.

== Selected publications ==
Yiftach's publications have been widely reviewed in prominent classical and papyrological journals, including the Bryn Mawr Classical Review, the Journal of Juristic Papyrology, The Classical Review, and the Journal of Hellenic Studies.

=== Monographs ===
- Marriage and Marital Arrangements: A History of the Greek Marriage Document in Egypt. 4th Century BCE—4th Century CE (Munich, 2003).
- The Taxonomy of Legal Documents: An Account of the Language and Terminology of Clauses in Greek Legal Documents From Ptolemaic, Roman and Byzantine Egypt (Liège, 2025).

=== Edited volumes ===
- Law and Legal Practice in Egypt from Alexander to the Arab Conquest (with J.G. Keenan and J.G. Manning; Cambridge, 2014).
- Legal Documents in Ancient Societies I: The Letter (Wiesbaden, 2013).
- Law and Transaction Costs in the Ancient Economy (co-edited; Ann Arbor, 2015).
- When West Met East: The Encounter of Greece and Rome With the Jews, Egyptians, and Others : Studies Presented to Ranon Katzoff in Honor of His 75TH Birthday
- Symposion 2017: Vorträge zur griechischen und hellenistischen Rechtsgeschichte (Tel Aviv, 20.–23. August 2017)
- Legal Documents in Ancient Societies VI. Ancient Guardianship: Legal Incapacities in the Ancient World. Trieste: EUT Edizioni Università di Trieste, 2017.
- Accounts and Bookkeeping in the Ancient World (with A. Jördens; Wiesbaden, 2020).
