= Comparative legal history =

Study of law across time and geography

Comparative legal history is the study of law in two or more different places or at different times. As a discipline, it emerged between 1930 and 1960 in response to legal formalism, and builds on scattered uses of legal-historical comparison since antiquity. It uses the techniques of legal history and comparative law.

== Definition and scope ==
Broadly, comparative legal history is "the study of related or parallel legal phenomena in two or more different places or at different times." Examples include continental forms of legal history such as European, South Asian or African legal histories, as well as comparative forms such as Chinese-European and Korean-European comparative legal history.

However, the precise scope of the subject is a matter of debate. It has been variously defined as "simply the opposite of purely national legal history", "the comparison of individuals, ideas and institutions from two or more legal traditions", the "study of related or parallel phenomena in two or more different places or at different times," the description and comparison of "the historical development of different legal traditions", with the objective of enabling "conclusions from the observed similarities and differences to enhance our understanding of the respective systems," and the observation of similarity or difference across time. Some scholars choose not to define it altogether, believing that rigid definitions will exclude meaningful research.

The discipline has definitional challenges. Comparative legal history cannot be easily distinguished from historically-informed comparative law. The words "comparison", "law" and "history", are difficult to define precisely, and combining them introduces further uncertainty about the scope of the intellectual inquiry in comparative legal history.

=== Relationship with national legal histories ===
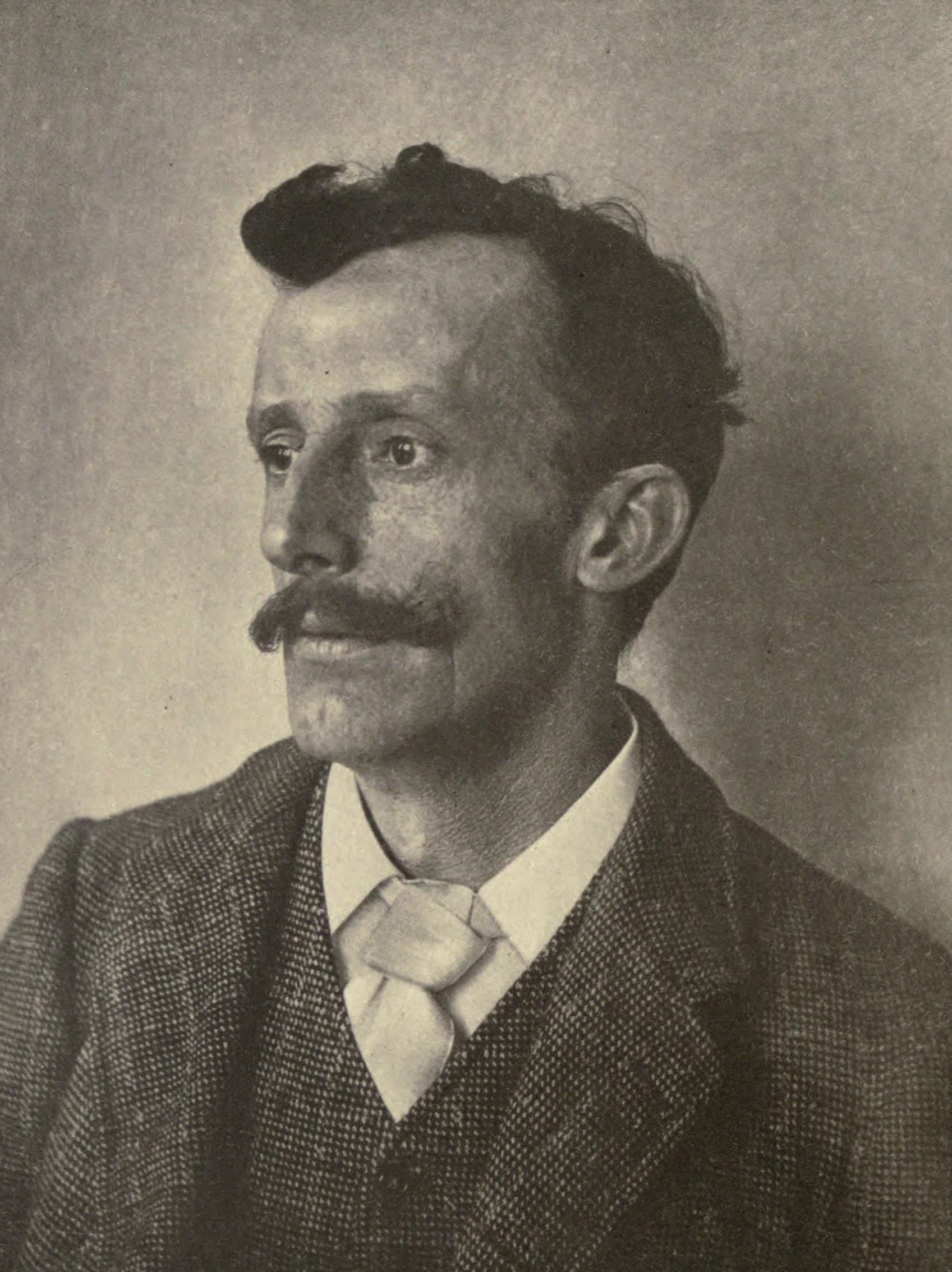
F.W. Maitland, who distinguished between comparative law and legal history.

Some scholars see comparative legal history as a movement arising in response to 19th-century legal formalism. This view defines the subject as "simply the opposite of purely national legal history".

Other scholars see intrinsic links between comparative law and legal history, both being forms of comparison (one across space and the other across time). This view privileges comparative legal history as the ideal comparative approach to law, and holds that national legal history is an incomplete or failed attempt at comparative law. Writing in the late 19th century, the English legal historian Frederic William Maitland separated legal history into national and comparative legal histories. He believed that there was too vast a range of material in manuscript and edited form, and that legal historians should concentrate on national legal histories, and then move on to comparative legal history.

Some countries have historically been so closely linked with others that analysing their national legal histories necessitates a pluralistic, comparative approach. An example is the legal histories of former colonies, which involve the study both of Western laws and of indigenous laws and norms. The Australian legal historian Bruce Kercher opined that this orientation towards "external legal history" led to colonial historians in countries like Canada, Australia and New Zealand engaging with other disciplines more often than European legal historians. In the nascent field of Indian legal history, scholars have called for legal history to be situated within a broader South Asian legal history, accounting for links such as a shared colonial past, religion, environmental history, and spatiality.

== History ==
=== Legal-historical comparison in antiquity to the early modern period ===
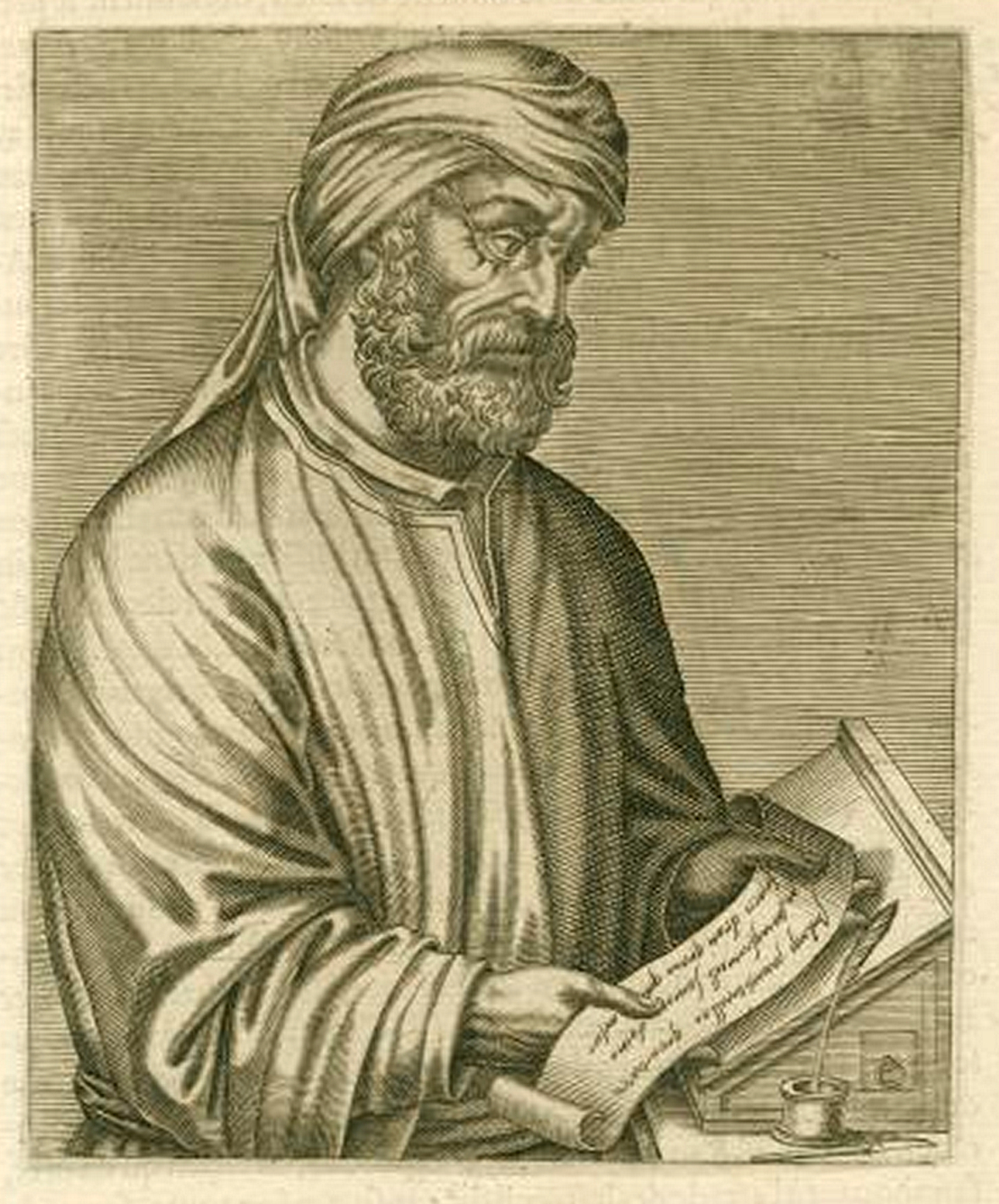
Tertullian (155 AD – 240 AD), who is among the earliest recorded legal-historical comparativists.

Although not explicitly recognised as comparative legal history, legal-historical comparison is present in a wide range of works from antiquity to the middle ages. In Politics, published in the 4th century BC, Aristotle references the constitutional law and history of 158 Greek city-states to argue that the organisation of a political community can lead its citizens to live lives of virtue. About five hundred years later, Church Fathers from Tertullian (155 AD – 240 AD) to Augustine of Hippo (354 AD – 430 AD) made comparisons between Jewish laws and customs, and texts from early Christianity. They used these comparisons to suggest that the Jewish failure to recognise Jesus as messiah nullified their claim to the biblical Kingdom of God. In the middle ages, the first continuous period of legal-historical constitutionalism came about with the rediscovery of Aristotle by English constitutionalists. Concerned by socio-political differences and competition, early modern English constitutionalists became more invested in civil law-common law comparisons. For instance, in John Fortescue's 15th century book In Praise of the Laws of England, Fortescue distinguished between England's "political and royal" kingship and the French civil law tradition's "only royal" kingship.

In the 16th century, comparative legal history was a methodological tool of the French humanists. Theorists such as Eguinaire Baron, François Baudouin, and François Hotman all compared the laws and customs as an element of their scholarship. Similarly, in Jean Bodin's Methodus ad Facilem Historiarum Cognitionem (1566), the comparative method was championed as "the only way to arrange the laws and govern the state is to collect all the laws of all or the most famous commonwealths, to compare them and derive the best variety." Following the humanists, the natural law school set their theories in a broadly comparative framework. Scholars such as Francis Bacon, Hugo Grotius, Gottfried Leibniz, and Samuel Pufendorf all drew upon foreign legal resources in the process of elaborating their theories. Whether this is to be treated as a true exercise in comparative legal history is controversial. One view is that their use of historical legal material was solely for the purposes of deducing their broader theories of law and justice, rather than being an end in itself. Other political theorists in the Enlightenment period, such as Giambattista Vico and Montesquieu, also carried out comparative legal history for illustrative purposes.

=== Early-modern to present ===
Comparative legal history methodology was practiced by a variety of specialised researchers in the 19th century. A prominent example is the legal anthropologist Henry Maine, who adopted a comparative and historical approach to legal systems of diverse cultures. Scholars of general national history, such as Numa Denis Fustel de Coulanges, Édouard Lambert in France, and Rafael Altamira in Spain all compared legal systems in the course of their historical work. There were also strands of historical legal comparison in works of the well-known sociologists, such as Max Weber; Émile Durkheim; Marcel Mauss; and Henri Lévy-Bruhl.

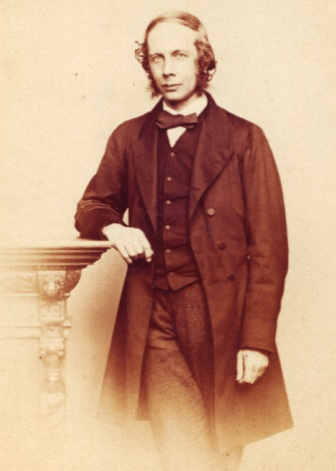
The legal anthropologist Henry Maine, who adopted a comparative and historical approach to legal systems of diverse cultures.

Conversely, legal history as an academic discipline initially focused exclusively on the legal histories of nations. There are differing views as to the causes and rationales for this. One is that this was a product of political rather than legal or scientific purposes. On similar lines, Giuliani argues that the fixation on national history was a lasting influence from the approach of the German legal historian Friedrich Carl von Savigny who identified nationally idiosyncratic Volksgeist as the source of law. Schmidt suggests that Savigny had "little interest in foreign law", an approach which then continued in the influential Germanic legal history departments. Another view is it was too difficult to make comparisons between legal systems without first having studied national legal histories, and that comparison was relegated to the future, for when national legal history had been more comprehensively studied. For Maitland, the late 19th and early 20th century were a period of national legal scholarship, and cosmopolitan tendencies could "wait their turn".

==== Modern history ====
As a consequence of legal history's narrow focus, comparative legal history as a distinct discipline remained fragmented into the 20th century. Providing a survey in 1997, Donahue summed up the state of the field: "[a]s I understand the term, comparative legal history hardly exists any place in the western world today". Nonetheless, examples of explicit historical comparative work from this period still exist. Two early usages of the term 'comparative legal history' can be found in articles from 1927 the 1960s and the term was increasingly used in the 1970s by scholars like Bernard S. Jackson, Pál Horváth, and Pierre Legrende. Additionally, there are two comparative legal journals from this period, 'Comparative Studies in Continental and Anglo-American Legal History' (1985–present), and 'Recueils de la Société Jean Bodin pour l'histoire comparative des institutions' (1936–2000), albeit they have been criticised for carrying out little meaningful comparison. Whilst not seen distinctly as comparative legal history, a historical approach was also developing within the emerging discipline of comparative law. Giuliani argues that comparativists such as John Dawson, Gino Gorla, and Robert Miller were beginning to take a more historical approach as a consequence of a wider rejection of legal formalism in the 20th century. Their position is reflected in the contemporary work of influential comparativist Rodolfo Sacco who argues "the comparative perspective is historical par excellence". Masferrer et al suggest that legal historians in the 1990s were also increasingly taking a comparative approach, though emphasise that use of the term 'comparative legal history' as an independent term remained rare.

The first two decades of the 21st century have involved a re-emergence and crystallisation of the study of comparative legal history. In 2009, the European Society for Comparative Legal History (ESCLH) was formed, and in 2013 it was followed by the European Journal of Comparative Legal History. The ESCLH has carried out six biennial conferences as of 2020 and hosts a variety of prizes and competitions for comparative legal historical research. The Max Planck Institute of European Legal History has also established a department for Comparative Legal History which carries out research into "European and comparative dimensions of legal history." Outside of Europe, the title of the 2020 American Society for Comparative Law conference was "Comparative Legal History", and studies of colonial history have increasingly involved legal-historical comparison. In present day, it has also received judicial recognition.

== Uses of comparative legal history ==
One school of thought believes that comparative law and legal history are both incomplete forms of a comparative approach to legal study. This encompasses the view that comparison is essential to legal history, and that historical context is essential to comparison.

An 18th-century map of Europe, where, despite national boundaries, legal systems produced many similar legal innovations.

Comparative approaches to legal history can help provide scholars with greater context behind contemporary laws and legal institutions. A comparative perspective recognise the growth of law via diffusion across national boundaries, and therefore can provide a better understanding of the meaning and value of existing law. The French jurist Jean-Louis Halpérin suggests that the similarities between ancient Chinese and Roman societies makes them especially useful for comparisons on the legal transformations of the state. Another example involves understanding the development and institutions of Islamic law and Middle Eastern legal systems in comparison with systems into which they came into contact, such as Roman law, Talmudic law, or the laws of ancient Mesopotamia. The Austrian-American scholar Ernst Rabel pointed to the value of comparison in filling in the gaps between incomplete historical texts. He illustrated the parallels between the English trust, the Roman fiducia, the Greek pistis, the Lombard fidejussio and dispensatio, and the German treuhand, all representing the intervention of a fiduciary.

Within legal history, comparative techniques and perspectives are increasingly regarded as a welcome antidote to purely national legal histories. Many legal systems share common rules, institutions, legal concepts and ideas. National legal history explains these features only by reference to national circumstances. In doing so, it is only able to produce a "founding myth" of the origins of existing law, in place of genuine historical research which would explore the law in all its complexity. The legal historians David Ibbetson, Andrew Lewis and Mortimer Sellers echo this view. Ibbetson argues that locating legal events within the context of time and space assists in better understanding their traits.

Comparative legal history is also closely connected to pedagogy and is seen as a useful tool for educating young legal academics and practicing lawyers. It enables both scholars and students to transcend the traditions and preconceptions that shape the legal culture they belong to. The Serbian legal scholar Sima Avramović argues that it should be a central subject mastered by the modern attorney. In his view, it enables "students to understand more profoundly nature of law, paths of its development, to scrutinize differences and similarities, to comprehend the kinds of ties among different legal families and systems, as well as to appreciate the connections among particular legal principles and institutions."

== Methodology and challenges ==
The English legal historian Andrew Lewis separates comparative legal history into "strong comparisons" and "weak comparisons". Strong comparisons refer to legal transplants, or the conclusions that a feature of a later legal system is borrowed from an earlier. Weak comparisons refer to the circumstantial or structural factors leading to systems separated by time and geography to adopt similar features.

=== Need for specialised knowledge and skill ===
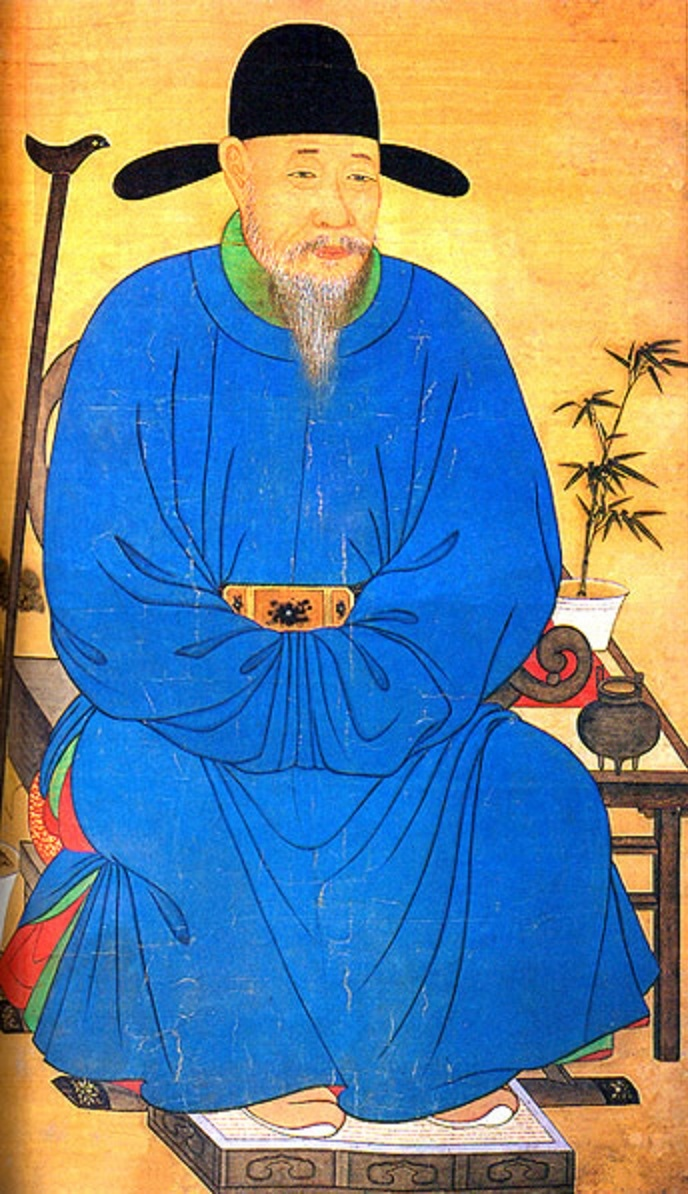
A portrait of Sejong the Great's Yeonguijeong Ha Yeon. In Chosŏn Korea, precedent referred to administrative rather than judicial acts.

Many scholars also emphasise the need for specialised knowledge and skill in comparative legal history. Availability of sources is a central challenge: comparative legal history requires access to primary texts, which are not always easily available outside the place they were produced. Many of these primary texts are also in unedited manuscript, and comparative legal historians may need to be proficient in multiple languages to properly understand them.

In addition, an anthropological knowledge of the societies of the legal systems being examined is required to avoid the situation where a scholar attuned to only one legal system "[sees] what [they] want to see" in another legal system. Scholars have variously suggested that comparative legal history is incomplete if it lacks a sociological dimension, that "it is impossible to know what it is like to think like an American or an Italian lawyer unless that condition is experienced in the first person", and that a valid examination of another legal culture requires immersion into [its] political, historical, economic, and linguistic context". Importantly, the role of law differs from society to society. In England, for example, the constitutional principle of the rule of law preserves the position of the law as a defence against the power of the state and the powerful. Conversely, in South Africa, apartheid was imposed "by the routine and systematic processes of courts and bureaucrats".

This kind of contextual knowledge serves two functions. Firstly, the conceptual structures of different systems of law need to be understood and processed to avoid mistranslation. For example, different legal systems process legal phenomena differently, so a question of tort in one system could be a question of contract in another. "Custom" is a key concept in both medieval English law and Chosŏn Korean law, but in the latter, it is used interchangeably to refer to practices, old customs, custom and customary law. "Precedent" is also used in both legal systems, but they refer to judicial decisions in the former, and administrative decisions in the latter. Secondly, comparative work requires a close understanding of legal culture, especially in terms of the relationship between legal science and legal outcomes. The role of lawyers and legal academics, for example, can differ greatly from one legal culture to another.

=== Imperialism and Eurocentrism ===
A key challenge of comparative legal history is Eurocentrism, which scholars have argued silences theoretical and methodological perspectives and renders entire geographic regions’ legal experiences invisible.

Within Chinese-European comparative legal history, comparison is rarely used as an analytical tool to understand European institutions better, but rather for European scholars to understand Chinese institutions by analogy with their own systems. In the process, studies of European history analytically colour the study of other legal traditions, resulting in a failure to engage with them on their own terms or through their own legal language. In Korean-European legal history, some scholars have drawn mistaken analogies between "custom" in European legal systems and in Chosŏn Korea.

Analyses of imperialism in African legal history frequently view colonial subjects through the lens of European domination. For instance, Africans often appear only as slaves and objects of European colonial orders. This leaves out, for example, the role of African conceptions of law and justice in forming colonial societies in Latin America.

Even within Europe, European legal history tends to neglect certain regions, such as Scandinavia and East-Central Europe.

== Criticisms ==
In the 19th century, the insights produced by comparative legal history were used to justify the "colonisation, subjugation and annihilation" of non-white, non-western, non-Christian populations. This continued into the 20th century, when it evolved to justify the forceful "modernisation" and of Third World countries by Western powers. Comparisons of legal systems were used as a yardstick for "civilisational progress", against which non-Western legal cultures could never compare favourably.

== Professional associations and academic institutions ==
- Department of European and Comparative Legal History at the Max Planck Institute
- The European Society for Comparative Legal History
- American Society for Legal History
- Institute for Roman Law and Comparative Legal History at the University of Bonn

== Journals and publications ==
- Journal of Comparative Legal History
- Comparative Studies in Continental and Anglo-American Legal History
- Comparative Legal History (Research Handbooks in Comparative Law series) (2019)
- The Robbins Collection: Studies in Comparative Legal History, School of Law, UC Berkeley (2012)
- Teaching Legal History: Comparative Perspectives (2014)
