= Reception statute =

Statutory law

A reception statute is a statutory law adopted as a former British colony becomes independent by which the new nation adopts, or receives, the English common law (and in some cases the statute law) before its independence to the extent not explicitly rejected by the legislative body or constitution of the new nation. Reception statutes generally consider the English common law dating prior to independence, as well as the precedents originating from it, as the default law because of the importance of using an extensive and predictable body of law to govern the conduct of citizens and businesses in a new state.

All US states have either implemented reception statutes or adopted the common law by judicial opinion, but there is a special case of partial reception for Louisiana.

== Initial reception of English common law ==
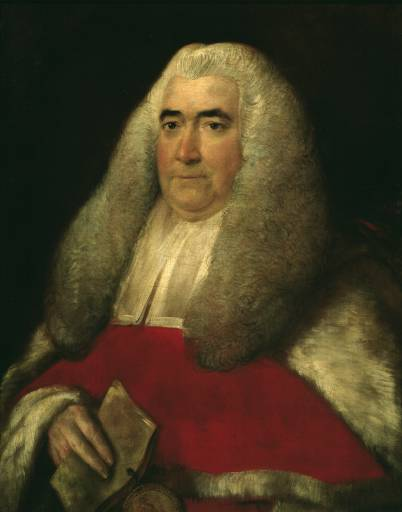
Justice William Blackstone described how the common law was adopted by British colonies

In Commentaries on the Laws of England, Sir William Blackstone described the process by which English common law followed English colonization:

Plantations or colonies, in distant countries, are either such where the lands are claimed by right of occupancy only, by finding them desert and uncultivated, and peopling them from the mother-country; or where, when already cultivated, they have been either gained by conquest, or ceded to us by treaties. And both these rights are founded upon the law of nature, or at least upon that of nations. But there is a difference between these two species of colonies, with respect to the laws by which they are bound. For it hath been held, that if an uninhabited country be discovered and planted by English subjects, all the English laws then in being, which are the birthright of every subject, are immediately there in force. ... But in conquered or ceded countries, that have already laws of their own, the king may indeed alter and change those laws; but, till he does actually change them, the ancient laws of the country remain, unless such as are against the law of God, as in the case of an infidel country.

In other words, if an "uninhabited" or "infidel" territory is colonised by Britain, the English law automatically applies in the territory from the moment of colonisation, but if the colonised territory has a pre-existing legal system, the native law would apply (effectively, a form of indirect rule) until it is formally superseded by the English law by royal prerogative, subjected to the Westminster Parliament.

As colonies gained independence from Britain, the newly independent countries usually adopted the precedents of English common law as of the date of independence as the default law to carry forward into the new nation, to the extent that was not explicitly rejected by the founding documents or government.

In some cases, the carry-forward was simply understood, with no express provision in either the new independence constitution or legislation. In other cases, the new legislature preferred to state redundantly but safely that common law had been received during the colonial period. Examples of both patterns are described below.

== Canada ==
The Canadian colonies received the common law and English statutes under Blackstone's principles for the establishment of the legal system of a new colony. In five of the ten Canadian provinces, English law was received automatically, under the principle of a settled colony inheriting English law. In the other provinces and in the three territories, reception was governed by reception statutes.

The reception of English law occurred long before Canada became achieved formal independence with the passage of the Canada Act 1982, so no reception statutes were necessary for the decolonialisation process. English law had already been received in all the various Canadian provinces and territories by legislation and judicial decisions over the previous two centuries.

=== Atlantic provinces ===
In the four Atlantic provinces (Nova Scotia, New Brunswick, Prince Edward Island, and Newfoundland and Labrador), the reception of English law was automatic, under the principle set out by Blackstone relating to settled colonies. British colonists were considered to have brought English common law and the applicable English statutes with them and so no reception statute was necessary.

The reception date for New Brunswick is 1660, for Nova Scotia and Prince Edward Island 1758, and for Newfoundland and Labrador 1825.

=== Quebec ===
Quebec was settled as a French colony and originally operated under the French civil law system by using the Coûtume de Paris. Upon the transfer of the colony to British control, the British government issued the Royal Proclamation of 1763, which imposed English common law on the colony under the principle set out in Blackstone relating to captured colonies. However, in 1774, the British Parliament passed the Quebec Act, which restored the French civil law for matters of private law (matters such as contracts, property, and successions (wills)) but kept the English common law as the basis for public law in the colony, notably the criminal law.

With the passage of the Civil Code of Lower Canada in 1866, Quebec's civil law became entirely statute-based and used the civil law system for matters within provincial jurisdiction.

Public law in Quebec continues to have its origin in the common law, but even then, civil law plays a strong role. If federal legislation requires interpretation, judges must look to the Civil Code of Quebec.

=== Ontario ===
The territory now forming Ontario was originally part of Quebec and so was under the civil law. When Quebec was divided into the two provinces of Upper and Lower Canada by the Constitutional Act of 1791, the first Act passed by the Legislature of Upper Canada was to adopt the law of England for all purposes, replacing the civil law. That statute adopted both the English common law and English statute law. The foundation for the operation of the common law in Ontario traces back to that reception statute.

=== Manitoba, Saskatchewan, Alberta, Nunavut, North-West Territories, and Yukon ===
The new Dominion of Canada acquired the territories of Rupert's Land and the North-Western Territory from the Hudson's Bay Company in 1870. Those territories were considered to have been settled by British colonists and so the reception of English law was automatic. However, the long history of control by the Hudson's Bay Company caused some uncertainty as to the date of reception. To resolve the uncertainty, various statutes were passed to set the date of reception to July 15, 1870, the date of the transfer of those two territories to Canada. The Province of Manitoba set that date for the reception of English law for matters coming within provincial jurisdiction. The Legislature of the North-West Territories passed an ordinance, adopting the same date for matters coming within territorial jurisdiction.

The federal Parliament eventually enacted a provision adopting that date for all matters in the North-West Territories. That provision was carried forward in the provinces of Alberta and Saskatchewan when they were created by the Alberta Act and the Saskatchewan Act. The same provision is the basis for the reception date of English law in the Northwest Territories, Yukon, and Nunavut.

=== British Columbia ===
British Columbia was considered to be a settled colony and so received English law automatically, under the principle set out by Blackstone.

== Australia ==
Despite the presence of indigenous inhabitants, Australia was determined to be "settled" rather than "conquered" and as a result all English law "applicable to the new situation and condition of the infant colony" applied, as opposed to the continuation of indigenous laws. This was confirmed by the Australian Courts Act 1828 (9 Geo. 4. c. 83 (Imp)) an act of the Imperial Parliament which had the effect of ensuring that all English common and statute law up to 28 July 1828 was to have effect in New South Wales and Tasmania, and later Victoria and Queensland when they separated from New South Wales. The reception of English law in Western Australia and South Australia was later deemed by statute to have occurred on 1 June 1829 and 28 December 1836 respectively.

== Hong Kong ==
Hong Kong was ceded (in case of the New Territories, leased) to the United Kingdom by Qing dynasty of China by a series of treaties, starting with the Treaty of Nanking in 1842. As a ceded or leased territory with its own set of laws, the Great Qing Legal Code remained in force for the local Chinese population. Until the late 19th century, a Chinese man convicted of murder would be executed by decapitation, but an Englishman convicted of the same crime would be sentenced to death by hanging. It was not until 1971, nearly six decades after the fall of the Qing dynasty, that the Qing Code was completely abolished in Hong Kong. Even then, some vestiges of it remain. For example, before the Marriage Reform Ordinance 1970 (Cap. 178) came into force on 7 October 1971, a man could practice polygamy by virtue of the Qing Code. The courts still refer to the Qing Code on the inheritance rights of surviving concubines married before 1971 and that of their children.

When Hong Kong was handed over to the People's Republic of China in 1997, Hong Kong retained the common law in a reception statute in Chapter I, Article 8, of the Hong Kong Basic Law:

The laws previously in force in Hong Kong, that is, the common law, rules of equity, ordinances, subordinate legislation and customary law shall be maintained, except for any that contravene this Law, and subject to any amendment by the legislature of the Hong Kong Special Administrative Region.

== Republic of Ireland ==
In March 1922 the British Irish Free State (Agreement) Act 1922 provided inter alia for the legal continuity of hundreds of existing laws and for the transfer of powers to the new Provisional Government of Ireland.

The 1922 Constitution of the Irish Free State stated that pre-existing laws would remain in force except if repugnant to it, and the 1937 Constitution of Ireland does likewise. Neither explicitly stated whether that meant only the statute law or, more broadly, the common law and equity as well. The Supreme Court has generally taken the broader view.

== United States ==
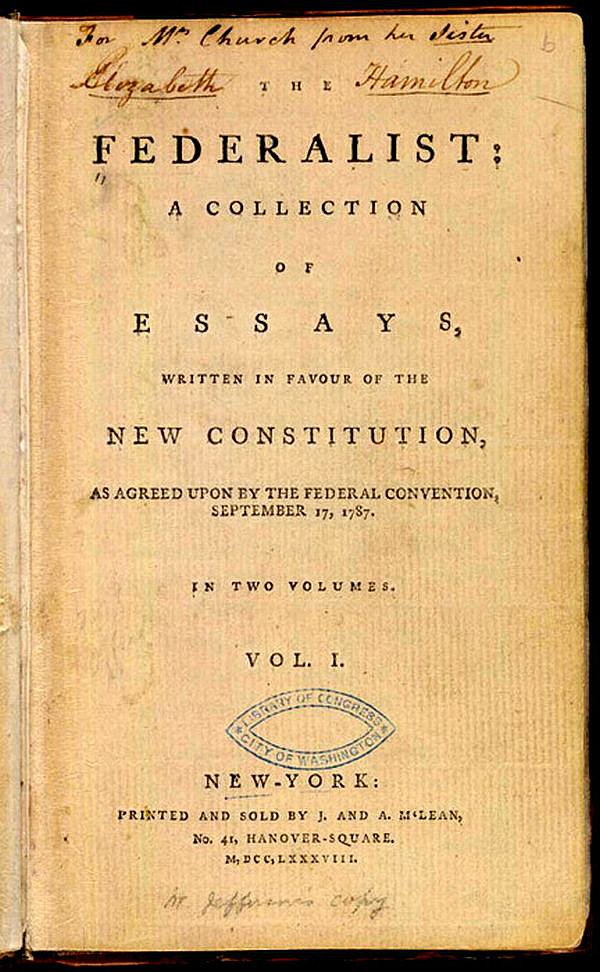
In the Federalist Papers, Alexander Hamilton emphasized that New York's reception provision still made the common law subject to alteration by a legislature's statute.

After the 1776 American Revolution, one of the first legislative acts undertaken by each of the newly independent states was to adopt a "reception statute" that gave legal effect to the existing body of English common law to the extent that the legislation or the constitution had not explicitly rejected English law. Some states enacted reception statutes as legislative statutes, but other states received the English common law by provisions of their constitution or by court decision. British traditions such as the monarchy were rejected by the US Constitution, but many English common law traditions such as habeas corpus, jury trials, and various other civil liberties were adopted in the United States. The specific components of English law that were actually received vary considerably from state to state, but it is clear that subsequent changes in England to those portions of English law after a particular state's date of reception have no binding force in that state. Significant elements of English common law prior to 1776 still remain in effect in many jurisdictions in the United States because they have never been rejected by American courts or legislatures.

For example, the New York Constitution of 1777 provides that:

[S]uch parts of the common law of England, and of the statute law of England and Great Britain, and of the acts of the legislature of the colony of New York, as together did form the law of the said colony on the 19th day of April, in the year of our Lord one thousand seven hundred and seventy-five, shall be and continue the law of this State, subject to such alterations and provisions as the legislature of this State shall, from time to time, make concerning the same.

April 19, 1775, is the date of the Battles of Lexington and Concord, the beginning of the American Revolutionary War. Alexander Hamilton emphasized in The Federalist Papers that the New York constitutional provision expressly made the common law subject "to such alterations and provisions as the legislature shall from time to time make concerning the same." Thus, even when reception was effected by a constitution, the common law was still subject to alteration by a legislature's statute.

The Northwest Ordinance, which was approved by the Congress of the Confederation in 1787, guaranteed "judicial proceedings according to the course of the common law". Nathan Dane, the primary author of the Northwest Ordinance, viewed that provision as a default mechanism if federal or territorial statutes were silent about a particular matter. He wrote that if "a statute makes an offence, and is silent as to the mode of trial, it shall be by jury, according to the course of the common law." In effect, the provision operated as a reception statute, giving legal authority to the established common law in the vast territories in which no states had yet been established. In 1795, the Governor and Judges of the Northwest Territory adopted a reception statute that was based on the Virginia statute.

Over time, as new states were formed from federal territories, the territorial reception statutes became obsolete and were re-enacted as state law. For example, a reception statute enacted by legislation in the state of Washington states, "The common law, so far as it is not inconsistent with the Constitution and laws of the United States, or of the state of Washington nor incompatible with the institutions and condition of society in this state, shall be the rule of decision in all the courts of this state." In that way, the common law was eventually incorporated into the legal systems of every state (except for the law of Louisiana for which some areas of law were received as common law and others were adopted from French and Spanish sources).

Certain anomalies exist within certain US states because of the effective branching of the law in different directions. For example, the Commonwealth of Virginia adopted the English common law upon becoming independent but before England abolished trial by combat. Thus, it has been argued that the right to request trial by combat theoretically still exists in Virginia, at least as far as a form of action under which the common law had authorized trial by combat would be available in Virginia.

== Other former British colonies ==
The pattern was repeated in many other former British colonies as they gained independence from the United Kingdom. New Zealand, India, Belize and various Caribbean and African nations have adopted English common law by reception statutes although they do not inevitably continue to copy English common law; later cases can often draw on decisions in other common law jurisdictions.

In imitation of many other British colonies, Israel created reception statutes upon its founding in 1948. However, these statutes erroneously included a repealed 1945 law, Defence (Emergency) Regulations, which had temporarily suspended key civil liberties. David Ben-Gurion organized an extensive cover-up to ensure that the first democratically elected Knesset did not realize that Britain had already repealed these emergency regulations.

== See also ==
- Common law § Propagation...
- Doctrine of reception
