= Lycée Français Fustel de Coulanges =

Coordinates: 3.8767°N 11.5163°E

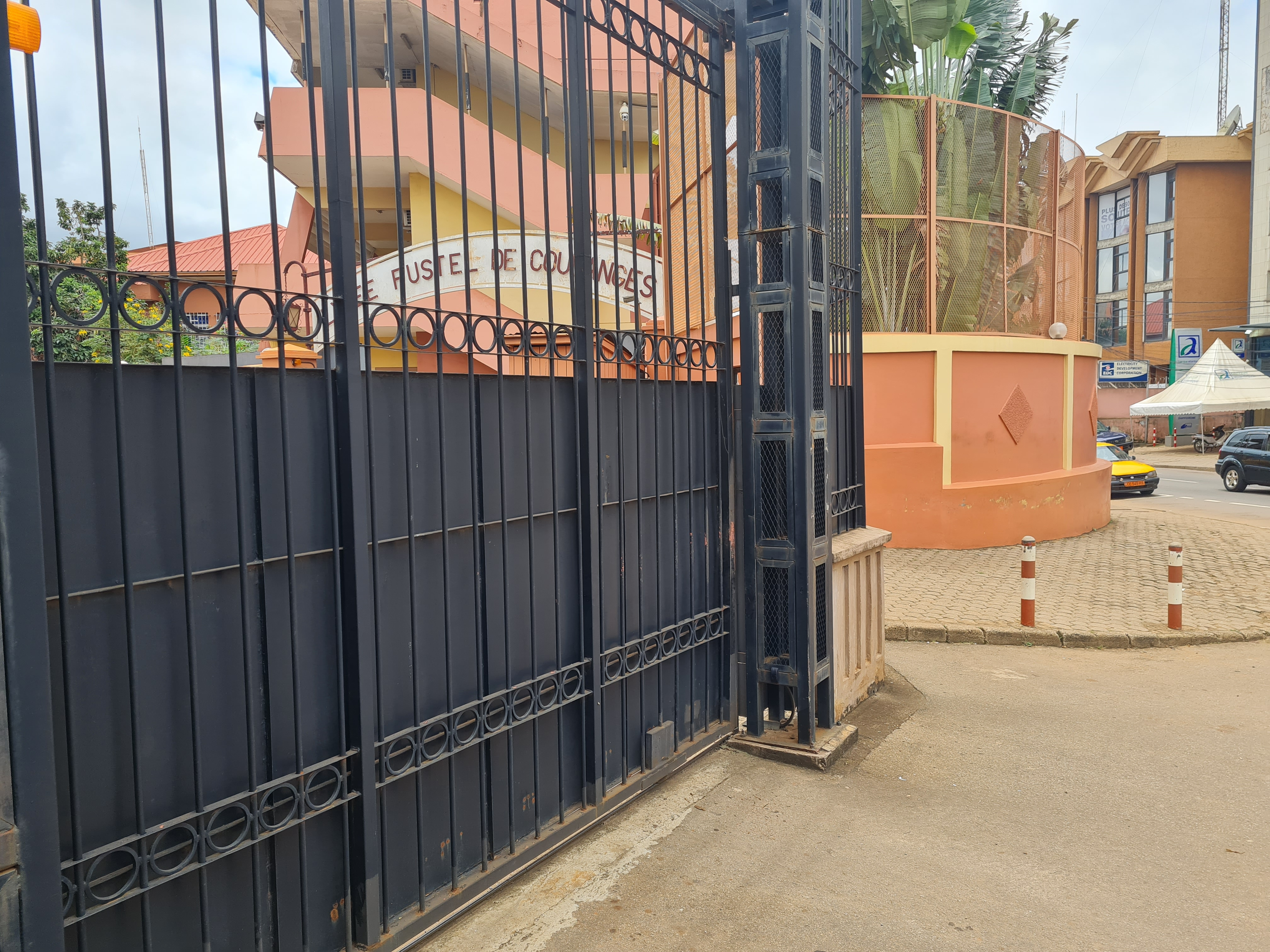
- School Entrance

Information
- School type: International School
- Established: 1967
- Age: 3 to 18

Lycée Français Fustel de Coulanges is a French international school in Yaoundé, Cameroon. It serves levels maternelle (preschool) through lycée (senior high school/sixth form).

The École française Fustel de Coulanges first opened along route de l'aéroport in 1967. The senior high school classes were established in 1972 through 1974. The primary school opened in 1975.
