= Andrew Lewis (professor) =

Andrew D. E. Lewis is an English legal scholar and Anglican clergyman with academic specialisms in Roman law, canon law, English legal history, and European legal history. He is Professor Emeritus of Comparative Legal History at University College London.

Lewis received his BA in 1970 and LLB in 1971 from the University of Cambridge.

== Selected publications ==
- Lewis, A. (2009). "Pitcairn's Tortured Past: A legal history". In D. Oliver (ed.), Justice, Legality, and the Rule of Law (pp. 39–61). Oxford, England: Oxford University Press].
- Lewis, A. (2007). "Martin Dockray and The Zong: A tribute in the form of a chronology". The Journal of Legal History, 28 (3), 357–370.
- Lewis, A. (2007). "When is a Tax not a Tax but a Tithe?". In J. Tiley (ed.), Studies in the History of Tax Law II (pp. 235–252). Oxford: Hart Publishing.
- Lewis, A. (2005). "Advocatio: A postponement in iure". Fundamina - Ex Iusta Causa Traditum: Essays in honour of Eric H. Pool, Editio specialis, 215–228.
- Lewis, A. (2005). "On Not Expecting the Spanish Inquisition: The Uses of Comparative Legal History". In J. Holder, C. O'Cinneide, M. Freeman (eds), Current Legal Problems, 2004, Volume 57 (pp. 53–84). Oxford: Oxford University Press.
- Lewis, A. D. E. (2003). "'Secundum legem' in Institutio Oratoria V.13.7." In O. Tellegen-Couperus (ed.), Quintilian and the Law (pp. 111–117). Leuven: Leuven University Press.
- Lewis, A. (2003). "Lincoln wills 1532–1534". J SOC ARCHIVISTS, 24 (1), 116–118.
- Lewis, A. (2003). "Smollett's assault". The Times Literary Supplement (5247), 19.
- Lewis, A. (2003). "The records of the Honorable Society of Lincoln's Inn". Black books, vol. 6, 1914–1965. J SOC ARCHIVISTS, 24 (1), 116–118.
- Lewis, A. D. E. (2000). "The Autonomy of Roman Law". In P. Coss (ed.), The Moral World of the Law, Past & Present Publications (pp. 37–47). Cambridge: Cambridge University Press.
- Lewis, A. D. E. (1997). "John Austin, The Province of Jurisprudence Determined". Utilitas, 9 (2), 267–270. doi:10.1017/S0953820800005355
- Lewis, A. D. E. (1997). "Roman Law in the Middle of the Third Millennium. In M. D. Freeman (ed.), Current Legal Problems 1997: Law and Opinion at the End of the Twentieth Century (pp. 397–419). Oxford: Oxford University Press.
- Lewis, A. D. E. (ed.). (1997). "The Journal of Legal History". The Journal of Legal History, 18 (1–3).
