= Market society =

The term market society can refer to either the free-market style of capitalism first popularized by Adam Smith, or (to a lesser extent) can also refer to government-instituted and/or controlled forms of the market, commonly called state capitalism. It is a term particularly associated with the Hungarian-American political economist Karl Polanyi and his book The Great Transformation, first published in 1944. David Denham also argues that the analysis of market societies is a key feature of the thought and writings of Karl Marx, Émile Durkheim and Max Weber.

The term market society differs from market economy in implying that capitalist market economics influences not just the exchange of goods and services in a society, but also directly impacts and helps shape the personal attitudes, lifestyles, and political views of its people. Lisa Herzog, in the Stanford Encyclopedia of Philosophy, refers to Polanyi's distinction between "market economies" and "market societies" as "vague, but nonetheless helpful distinction".
