= Alan Watson (legal scholar) =

Scottish legal historian (1933–2018)

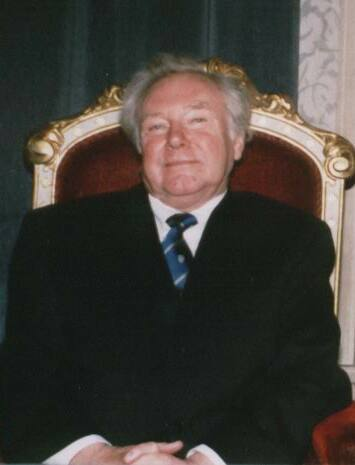
- Born: 1933; Edinburgh, Scotland
- Died: 7 November 2018 (aged 84–85)
- Education: University of Glasgow
- Occupation: Academic legal historian
- Spouse: Camilla Watson
- Website: http://awf.ius.bg.ac.rs

W. Alan J. Watson (1933 – 7 November 2018) was a Scottish legal historian, regarded as a major authority as on Roman law, comparative law, legal history, and law and religion. He is credited with coining the term "legal transplants".

== Life and career ==
Watson was educated at St John's Grammar school and at the Hamilton Academy, subsequently attending the Glasgow University, graduating in Arts in 1954 and in Law in 1957. He began his professional academic career at Oxford University, before taking the Douglas Chair in Civil Law at the School of Law of his alma mater, the University of Glasgow. He later served as Distinguished Research Professor and held the Ernest P. Rogers Chair at the University of Georgia School of Law. He was also Visiting Professor at the Edinburgh University School of Law, where he held the Chair in Civil Law from 1968 until 1981.

Watson regularly served as a distinguished lecturer at leading universities in the United States and such countries as Italy, Holland, Germany, France, Poland, South Africa, Israel and Serbia. He attended several sessions regarding the development of a common law for the EU, including one in Maastricht in 2000, and, at the request of the U.S. Agency for International Development (USAID), served as a member of the two-person U.S. team helping to revise the draft civil code for Armenia.

He was an honorary member of the Speculative Society and served as North American secretary of the Stair Society. He was an editorial board member of a number of learned journals.

In 2005, the University of Belgrade's Law School established the Alan Watson Foundation in honour of his worldwide scholarship.

Watson was honoured by his international colleagues in 2000–01 when two collections of essays were presented in his honour: an American volume, Lex et Romanitas: Essays for Alan Watson, and the European volume, Critical Studies in Ancient Law, Comparative Law and Legal History.

== Legal scholarship ==
Watson authored nearly 150 books and articles, many of which have been translated from English into other languages. Selected scholarship includes the important books Legal Transplants: An Approach to Comparative Law (1974) and Society and Legal Change (1977) as well as The Evolution of Western Private Law (2000), Jesus and the Jews: The Pharisaic Tradition in John (1995), Ancient Law and Modern Understanding: At the Edges (1998), Sources of Law, Legal Change, and Ambiguity (2d ed., 1998), Legal History and a Common Law for Europe (2001), Authority of Law; and Law (2003), and The Shame of American Legal Education (2005). His articles include "Law Out of Context" in The Edinburgh Law Review (2000) and "Fox Hunting, Pheasant Shooting and Comparative Law" in the American Journal of Comparative Law (2000).
