= Tajmâat =

Pan-Berber social and political institution

The tajmâat, in Tamazight: ⵜⴰⵊⵎⴰⵄⵜ, also rendered as tajmaɛt, or known as ⴰⴳⵔⴰⵡ (agraw), is a pan-Berber social and political institution historically present in several North African societies. It is particularly documented in Kabylia, the Aurès, the M'zab, the Hoggar, the Sous, the Rif and the Middle Atlas.

The tajmâat refers both to the village assembly itself and to the physical space where it convenes. Traditionally composed of adult male members of the community, it functioned as the central authority of the village, regulating political, legal, and social affairs through collective deliberation.

== Functions and governance ==
Historically, the tajmâat exercised legislative, executive, and judicial functions at the village level. Through collective decision-making, it adopted binding customary rules known as qanun or izref, which governed land ownership, water distribution, conflict resolution, inheritance practices, and communal obligations.

The tajmâat enforced these rules through fines (leɣram), mediation, and social sanctions rather than corporal punishment. Fines collected were allocated to collective expenditures, including village maintenance, religious ceremonies, hospitality for travelers, and assistance to vulnerable members of the community.

Collective labor initiatives known as tiwizi were also organized under the authority of the tajmâat, reinforcing social cohesion and mutual assistance.

== Leadership ==
The assembly elected a village chief known as amghar or ameqran, responsible for representing the community and overseeing the implementation of decisions. An executive officer, often called an amin, ensured the enforcement of resolutions, while an oukil (or amazzal in Morocco) managed communal resources and the collection of fines.

In Kabylia, the village imam, frequently associated with a marabout lineage, often acted as secretary of the tajmâat, recorded decisions, announced resolutions, and fulfilled religious and educational functions.

== Customary law and legal pluralism ==
The legal system administered by the tajmâat formed part of a broader Amazigh customary law tradition. This system historically coexisted with Islamic law (fiqh) and, during the colonial period, with French legal institutions. Scholars describe this coexistence as a form of legal pluralism, in which multiple normative systems operated simultaneously at different levels of society.

Colonial-era ethnographic and legal studies documented numerous village-specific qanun, highlighting the decentralized and adaptive character of tajmâat governance. Despite efforts by colonial authorities to marginalize or codify customary institutions, the tajmâat often persisted as a de facto regulator of daily life in rural and mountainous regions.

== Decision-making and participation ==
Decision-making within the tajmâat was based on public deliberation and consensus among its members. Although participation was traditionally limited to adult men, the system emphasized collective responsibility, transparency, and accountability. Decisions were publicly announced and uniformly applied, reinforcing the legitimacy of the assembly.

Women did not formally participate in the tajmâat but exercised indirect influence through family networks, economic activities, and moral authority within the community. Researchers note that this exclusion reflected historical social structures rather than an explicit ideological doctrine.

== Transformation and contemporary survivals ==
Following the establishment of centralized nation-states in North Africa, the political authority of the tajmâat was progressively reduced or replaced by formal administrative institutions. Nevertheless, in several regions, particularly in Kabylia, elements of tajmâat governance have persisted in informal or symbolic forms.

Contemporary village committees inspired by the tajmâat continue to manage communal resources, mediate disputes, and organize collective initiatives. Anthropologists describe this persistence as a form of institutional resilience, in which customary governance adapts to modern political frameworks rather than disappearing entirely.

In 2024, Algerian President Abdelmadjid Tebboune publicly referred to the tajmâat as an example of participatory local organization, highlighting its historical role in community management.

== Comparative perspectives ==
Comparable forms of local assemblies have existed in various societies worldwide, including Mediterranean, African, and Asian village councils. Comparative studies emphasize similarities in consensus-based decision-making, conflict mediation, and communal autonomy.

Within the Amazigh world, analogous institutions are documented among the Tuareg (ameney), Rifian communities, and the Sous region, reflecting shared principles of decentralized governance.

== See also ==
- Berber
- Customary law
- Legal pluralism
