= Ancient Law =

Book by Henry James Sumner Maine

Ancient Law; Its Connection to the Early History of Society, and Its Relation to Modern Ideas
- Author: Henry Maine
- Language: English
- Genre: Law, History
- Publisher: John Murray
- Publication date: 1861
- Publication place: United Kingdom
- Media type: Print
- Pages: 260
- ISBN: 978-1596052260

Ancient Law is a book by Henry James Sumner Maine. It was first published in octavo in 1861. The book went through twelve editions during the lifetime of the author. The twelfth edition was published in 1888. A new edition, with notes by Frederick Pollock, was published in octavo in 1906.

Lectures delivered by Maine for the Inns of Court were the groundwork for Ancient Law. Its object, as stated in the preface, was "to indicate some of the earliest ideas of mankind, as they are reflected in ancient law, and to point out the relation of those ideas to modern thought. The book is noted for its work on origin and nature of legal institutions.

== See also ==
- Numa Denis Fustel de Coulanges and his The Ancient City (1864)
