= Henry James Sumner Maine =

British jurist and historian (1822–1888)

Sir Henry Maine
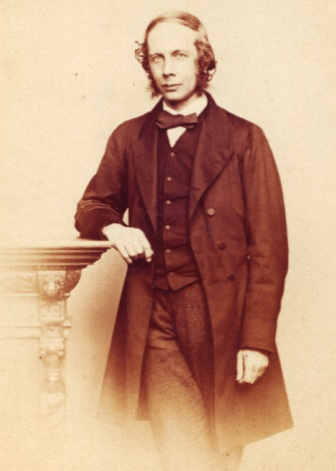
- The young Maine
- Born: 15 August 1822; Kelso, Scotland, UK
- Died: 3 February 1888 (aged 65); Cannes, France
- Education: Pembroke College, Cambridge
- Title: Corpus Professor of Jurisprudence at Oxford University; Whewell Professor of International Law
- Predecessor: William Harcourt
- Successor: John Westlake
- Scientific career
- Fields: History, law
- Workplaces: University of Oxford; University of Cambridge; University of Calcutta

Signature
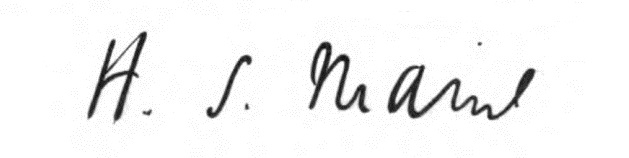

Sir Henry James Sumner Maine, KCSI, FRS (15 August 1822 – 3 February 1888), was a British Whig comparative jurist and historian. He is famous for the thesis outlined in his book Ancient Law that law and society developed "from status to contract." According to the thesis, in the ancient world individuals were tightly bound by status dealing with(in) a particular group while in the modern one, in which individuals are viewed as autonomous agents, they are free to make contracts and form associations with whomever they choose. Because of this thesis, Maine can be seen as one of the forefathers of modern legal anthropology, legal history and sociology of law.

== Early life ==
Maine was the son of Dr. James Maine, of Kelso, Roxburghshire. He was educated at Christ's Hospital, where a boarding house was named after him in 1902, being the 7th block on the avenue, and 3rd on the East Side. From there he went up to Pembroke College, Cambridge, in 1840. At Cambridge, he was noted as a classical scholar and also won the Chancellor's Gold Medal for poetry in 1842. He won a Craven scholarship and graduated as senior classic in 1844, being also senior chancellor's medallist in classics. He was a Cambridge Apostle.

Shortly afterwards, he accepted a tutorship at Trinity Hall. In 1847, he was appointed Regius Professor of Civil Law, and he was called to the bar three years later; he held this chair until 1854. Meanwhile, in 1852 he had become one of the readers appointed by the Inns of Court.

== In India ==
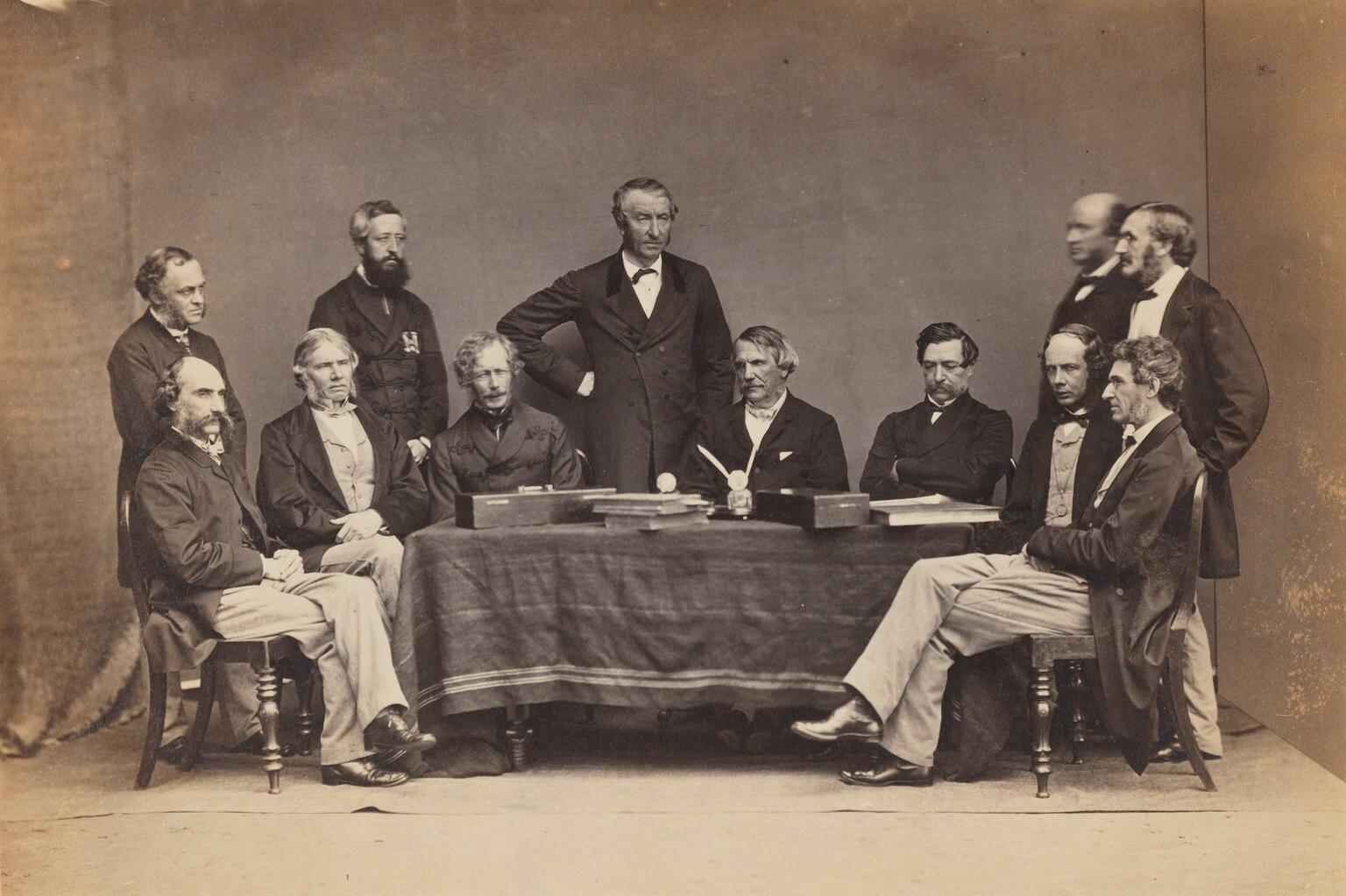
Maine, sitting second from right, with John Lawrence, Viceroy of India and other council members and secretaries in Simla, India, by Bourne & Shepherd, circa 1864.

The post of legal member of council in India was offered to Maine in 1861; he declined it once, on grounds of health. The following year Maine was persuaded to accept, and it turned out that India suited him much better than Cambridge or London. He was asked to prolong his services beyond the regular term of five years, and he returned to England in 1869.

The subjects on which it was Maine's duty to advise the government of India were as much political as legal. They ranged from such problems as the land settlement of the Punjab, or the introduction of civil marriage to provide for the needs of unorthodox Hindus, to the question of how far the study of Persian should be required or encouraged among European civil servants. Plans of codification were prepared, and largely shaped, under Maine's direction, which were implemented by his successors, Sir James Fitzjames Stephen and Dr Whitley Stokes.

Maine became a member of the Secretary of State's council in 1871 and remained so for the rest of his life. In the same year he was gazetted a K.C.S.I.

== Oxford professor ==
In 1869, Maine was appointed to the chair of historical and comparative jurisprudence newly founded in the University of Oxford by Corpus Christi College. Residence at Oxford was not required, and the election amounted to an invitation to the new professor to resume and continue in his own way the work he had begun in Ancient Law.

== Cambridge professor ==
In 1877, the mastership of Trinity Hall, Cambridge, where Maine had formerly been tutor, became vacant. There were two strong candidates whose claims were so nearly equal that it was difficult to elect either; the difficulty was solved by a unanimous invitation to Maine to accept the post. His acceptance entailed the resignation of the Oxford chair, though not continuous residence at Cambridge. Ten years later, he was elected to succeed Sir William Harcourt as Whewell Professor of International Law at Cambridge.

In 1886, he was elected as a member to the American Philosophical Society.

== Death ==
Maine's health, which had never been strong, gave way towards the end of 1887. He went to the Riviera under medical advice, and died at Cannes, France, on 3 February 1888. He left a wife, Jane, and two sons, of whom the elder died soon afterwards. An oil portrait of Jane remains in the possession of their descendants.

== Works ==
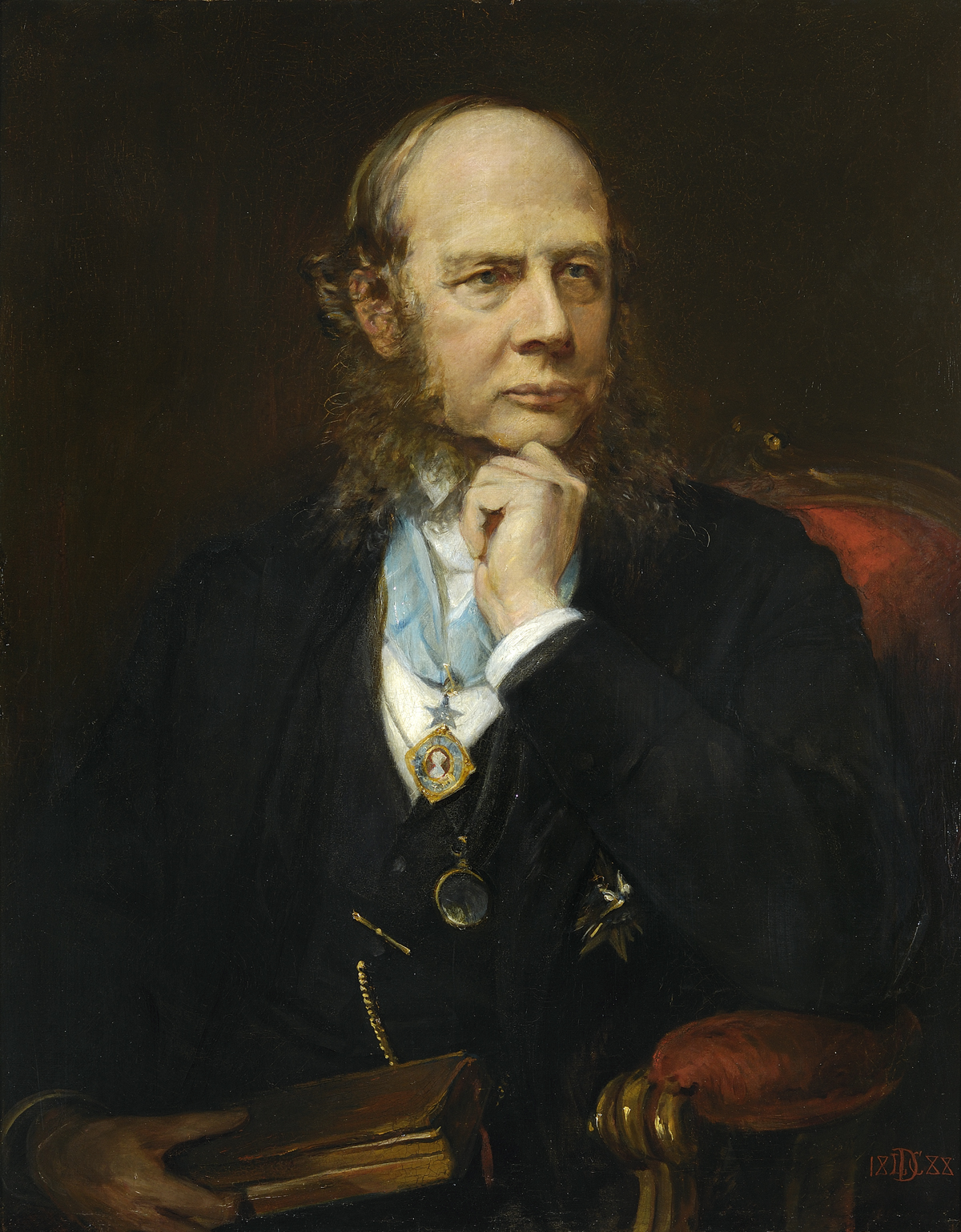
Sir Henry James Sumner Maine, by Lowes Cato Dickinson, 1888.

Maine wrote journalism in 1851 for the Morning Chronicle, edited by John Douglas Cook. With Cook and others, in 1855, he then founded and edited the Saturday Review, writing for it to 1861. Like his close friend James Fitzjames Stephen, he enjoyed occasional article-writing, and never quite abandoned it.

Maine contributed to the Cambridge Essays an essay on Roman law and legal education, republished in the later editions of Village Communities. Lectures delivered by Maine for the Inns of Court were the groundwork of Ancient Law (1861), the book by which his reputation was made at one stroke. Its object, as stated in the preface, was "to indicate some of the earliest ideas of mankind, as they are reflected in ancient law, and to point out the relation of those ideas to modern thought." He published the substance of his Oxford lectures: Village Communities in the East and the West (1871); Early History of Institutions (1875); Early Law and Custom (1883). In all these works, the phenomena of societies in an archaic stage are brought into line to illustrate the process of development in legal and political ideas (see freedom of contract).

As vice-chancellor of the University of Calcutta, Maine commented on the results produced by the contact of Eastern and Western thought. Three of these addresses were published, wholly or in part, in the later editions of Village Communities; the substance of others is in the Rede lecture of 1875, in the same volume. An essay on India was his contribution to the composite work entitled The Reign of Queen Victoria (editor Thomas Humphry Ward, 1887).

His brief work in international law is represented by the posthumous volume International Law (1888). Maine had published in 1885 his one work of speculative politics, a volume of essays on Popular Government, designed to show that democracy is not in itself more stable than any other form of government and that there is no necessary connexion between democracy and progress.

In 1886, there appeared in the Quarterly Review an article on the posthumous work of J. F. McLennan, edited and completed by his brother, entitled "The Patriarchal Theory". The article, though unsigned by the rule of the Quarterly at the time, was Maine's reply to the McLennan brothers' attack on the historical reconstruction of the Indo-European family system put forward in Ancient Law and supplemented in Early Law and Custom. Maine charged McLennan in his theory of primitive society with neglecting and misunderstanding of the Indo-European evidence.

A summary of Maine's writings was in Sir Mountstuart Grant Duff's memoir.

=== Selected publications ===
- Ancient Law: Its Connection with the Early History of Society, and Its Relation to Modern Ideas. London: John Murray, 1861.
- Village-Communities in the East and West. London: John Murray, 1871.
- The Early History of the Property of Married Women. Manchester: A. Ireland and Co., 1873.
- Lectures on the Early History of Institutions. New York: Henry Holt and Company, 1875.
- Dissertations on Early Law and Custom: Chiefly Selected from Lectures Delivered at Oxford. London: John Murray, 1883.
- Popular Government: Four Essays. London: John Murray, 1885.
- International Law: A Series of Lectures Delivered Before the University of Cambridge, 1887. London: John Murray, 1888.
- Plato: A Poem. Cambridge: Privately Printed, 1894.

=== Selected articles ===
- "Mr. Fitzjames Stephen's Introduction to the Indian Evidence Act," The Fortnightly Review, Vol. XIX, 1873.
- "South Slavonians and Rajpoots," The Nineteenth Century, Vol. II, 1877.
- "The King and his Successor," The Fortnightly Review, Vol. XXXVII, 1882.
