= Judith Scheele =

Social anthropologist

Judith Scheele is a social anthropologist who works in the Sahara. Scheele is based at the EHESS, France.

== Career ==
Scheele obtained her DPhil (PhD) from the University of Oxford. From 2006-2009, she was a fellow by examination at Magdalen College, Oxford. In 2009 she was the All Souls College Evans Pritchard lecturer. Also in 2009, Scheele was elected as a fellow of All Souls College, Oxford. Scheele is Directrice d’études at the Écoles des Hautes Études en Sciences Sociales in Paris. She holds an Alexander von Humboldt Fellowship at the Leibniz-Zentrum Moderner Orient in Berlin.

In 2019 she gave the Malinowski Memorial Lecture at LSE in London.

In 2021-2022, she was a member of the Institute for Advanced Study in Princeton, New Jersey.

== Selected publications ==
=== Monographs ===
Village Matters: Knowledge, Politics and Community in Kabylia (Algeria) (Oxford: James Currey, 2009).

Smugglers and Saints of the Sahara: Regional Connectivity in the Twentieth Century (Cambridge: Cambridge University Press, 2012).

(with Julien Brachet) The Value of Disorder: Autonomy, Prosperity, and Plunder in the Chadian Sahara (Cambridge: Cambridge University Press, 2019).

Shifting Sands: A Human History of the Sahara (New York: Basic Books, 2025).

=== Edited volumes ===
(ed. with James McDougall) Saharan Frontiers: Space and Mobility in Northwest Africa (Bloomington: Indiana University Press, 2012).

(ed. with Fernanda Pirie) Legalism: Community and Justice (Oxford: Oxford University Press, 2014).

(ed. with Paul Dresch) Legalism: Rules and Categories (Oxford: Oxford University Press, 2015).

(ed. with A. Shryock) The Scandal of Continuity in Middle East Anthropology: Form, Duration, Difference. (Bloomington: Indiana University Press, 2019)

=== Articles ===
- (with Julien Brachet) 'Remoteness is power: disconnection as a relation in northern Chad', Social Anthropology 27/2, (2019) 156-71.
- 'Ravens Reconsidered: Raiding And Theft Among Tubu-Speakers In Northern Chad', African Studies Review 61/3, (2018), 135-55 61/3 135-55 https://doi.org/10.1017/asr.2018.34
- 'The Libyan connection: settlement, war, and other entanglements in northern Chad', Journal of African History 57/1 (2016), 1-20.
- (with Julien Brachet) 'A ‘despicable shambles’: labour, property and status in Faya-Largeau, northern Chad', Africa, 86/1, (2016), 122-41.
- (with Julien Brachet) 'Fleeting glory in a wasteland: wealth, politics, and autonomy in northern Chad', Comparative Studies in Society and History 57/3 (2015), 723-52.
- 'The values of 'anarchy': moral autonomy among Tubu-speakers in northern Chad', Journal of the Royal Anthropological Institute 21/1 (2015), 32-48.
- 'A pilgrimage to Arawân: religious legitimacy, status and ownership in Timbuktu', American Ethnologist 40/1, (2013), 165-81.
- 'Traders, saints and irrigation: reflections on Saharan connectivity', Journal of African History 51/3, (2010), 281-300.
- 'Councils without customs, qadis without states: property and community in the Algerian Touat', Islamic Law and Society 17/3, (2010), 350-74.
- 'A taste for law: rule-making in Kabylia (Algeria)', Comparative Studies in Society and History 50/4, (2008), 895-919.
- 'Recycling baraka: knowledge, politics and religion in contemporary Algeria', Comparative Studies in Society and History 49/2, (2007), 304-28.
- 'Algerian Graveyard Stories', Journal of the Royal Anthropological Institute, 12/4, (2006), 859-79. https://doi.org/10.1111/j.1467-9655.2006.00367.x
- 'Generating Martyrdom: forgetting the war in contemporary Algeria', Studies in Ethnicity and Nationalism, Special Issue 6/2, (2006), 180-94.
