= Legal transplant =

Moving of a system of rule or system of law from one country to another

The term legal transplant was coined in the 1970s by the Scottish legal scholar W.A.J. 'Alan' Watson to indicate the moving of a rule or a system of law from one country to another (A. Watson, Legal Transplants: An Approach to Comparative Law, Edinburgh, 1974). The notion of legal transplantation is diffusionism-based and according to this concept most changes in most legal systems occur as the result of borrowing. As maintained by Watson, transplantation is the most fertile source of legal development.

== Background ==
Laws are commonly inspired by foreign policies and experiences. Regardless of the academic discourses on whether legal transplants are sustainable as a notion in the legal theory, they are common practice. Nevertheless, the degree to which new laws are inspired by foreign examples can vary. A frequent and often justified criticism is that imported laws are not suited for a certain local context.

German jurist Friedrich Carl von Savigny and his historical school of jurisprudence, which was inspired by the 19th-century Romanticism, have notably promoted the origins of the German people and their distinctive ethos, or Volksgeist (“the spirit of a people”). Savigny’s school of legal thought expressed the need of legal change to respect the continuity of the Volksgeist offering a pre-Darwinian concept of juristic evolution. However, this concept of juristic evolution did not leave much space for notions such as legal transplants and the diffusion of law. More recently, Pierre Legrand is one of the strongest opponents of legal transplants.

== Recent developments ==
Today, legal transplants are often mentioned in the broader process of diffusion of law or legal acculturation. J.W. Powell is credited with coining the word “acculturation”, first using it in an 1880 report by the US Bureau of American Ethnography. He explained that this term refers to the psychological changes induced by cross-cultural imitation. In a broader context, such notion is by many contemporary scholars applied to legal thought. The diffusion of law is a process of legal change in today’s age of globalization. Studies on diffusion of law are notably a new area of research in the 21st century.

In 1998, Gunther Teubner expanded the notion of legal transplantation, introducing the concept of legal irritation: Rather than smoothly integrating into domestic legal systems, a foreign rule disrupts established norms and societal arrangements. This disruption sparks an evolution where the external rule's meaning is redefined and where significant transformations within the internal context are triggered. Lasse Schuldt added that irritation is not spontaneous, but requires institutional drivers. As an example, Schuldt points to the introduction of corporate criminal liability in Thailand (a concept originally stemming from English law), which was driven by pivotal decisions of the Supreme Court of Thailand.
