= Numa Denis Fustel de Coulanges =

French historian and religious scholar (1830–1889)

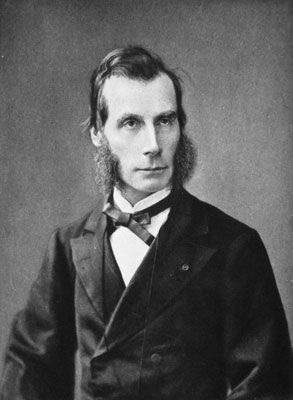
- Born: 18 March 1830; Paris, Kingdom of France
- Died: 12 September 1889 (aged 59); Massy, Essonne, France

Academic background
- Education: École normale supérieure French School at Athens
- Influences: Tocqueville · Polybius · Dubos · Guizot · Descartes

Academic work
- Era: Nineteenth century
- Notable works: La Cité antique (1864)
- Influenced: Durkheim · Jullian · Maurras · Marx

Numa Denis Fustel de Coulanges (French: [kulɑ̃ʒ]; 18 March 1830 – 12 September 1889) was a French historian and religious scholar best known for his work on ancient society and primitive religion.

== Biography ==
Fustel de Coulanges was born in Paris and was of Breton descent. After studying at the École Normale Supérieure, he attended the French School at Athens.

=== Career ===
In 1853, he directed some excavations in Chios and wrote a historical account of the island.

After his return, he held various educational positions and earned his doctorate degree with two theses: Quid Vestae cultus in institutis veterum privatis publicisque valuerit and Polybe, ou la Grèce conquise par les Romains (1858). His knowledge of Greek and Roman institutions and skepticism of contemporary scholars led him to rely on original texts. Once he formed a clear idea from the sources, he treated it as truth.

From 1860 to 1870, he was a professor of history at the faculty of letters at Strasbourg, where he had a brilliant career as a teacher, but never yielded to the influence exercised by the German universities in the field of classical and Germanic antiquities.

Fustel de Coulanges was appointed to a lectureship at the École Normale Supérieure in February 1870, to a professorship at the Paris faculty of letters in 1875, and to the chair of medieval history created for him at the Sorbonne in 1878, he applied himself to the study of the political institutions of ancient France. The invasion of France by the German armies during the Franco-Prussian War attracted his attention to the Germanic invasions under the Roman Empire. Pursuing the theory of J.-B. Dubos, but also transforming it, he maintained that those invasions were not marked by the violent and destructive character usually attributed to them; that the penetration of the German barbarians into Gaul was a slow process; that the Germans submitted to the imperial administration; that the political institutions of the Merovingians had their origins in the Roman laws at least as much as, if not more than, in German usages; and, consequently, that there was no conquest of Gaul by the Germans.

He sustained the thesis in his Histoire des institutions politiques de l'ancienne France, the first volume of which appeared in 1874. It was the author's original intention to complete this work in four volumes, but as the first volume was keenly attacked in Germany as well as in France, Fustel was forced in self-defense to recast the book entirely. He re-examined all the texts and wrote a number of dissertations, which were dominated by his general idea and characterised by a total disregard for the results of such historical disciplines as diplomatic. From this crucible, issued an entirely new work, less well arranged than the original, but rich in facts and critical comments. The first volume was expanded into three volumes, La Gaule romaine (1891), L'Invasion germanique et la fin de l'empire (1891) and La Monarchie franque (1888), followed by three other volumes, L'Alleu et le domaine rural pendant l'époque mérovingienne (1889), Les Origines du système féodal: le bénéfice et le patronat ... (1890) and Les Transformations de la royauté pendant l'époque carolingienne (1892).

Thus, in six volumes, he had carried the work no farther than the Carolingian period. The dissertations not embodied in his work were collected by himself and (after his death) by his pupil, Camille Jullian, and published as volumes of miscellanies: Recherches sur quelques problèmes d'Histoire (1885), dealing with the Roman colonate, the land system in Normandy; the Germanic mark, and the judiciary organization in the kingdom of the Franks; Nouvelles recherches sur quelques problèmes d'histoire (1891); and Questions historiques (1893), which contains his paper on Chios and his thesis on Polybius.

His life was devoted almost entirely to his teaching and his books. In 1875, he was elected member of the Académie des Sciences Morales et Politiques, and in 1880 reluctantly accepted the post of director of the École Normale. Without intervening personally in French politics, he took a keen interest in the questions of administration and social reorganization arising from the fall of the imperialist régime and the disasters of the war.

He wished the institutions of the present to approximate more closely to those of the past and devised for the new French constitution a body of reforms which reflected the opinions he had formed upon the democracy at Rome and in ancient France. He died at Massy (then called Seine-et-Oise) in 1889.

Throughout his historical career at the École Normale and the Sorbonne and in his lectures delivered to the empress Eugénie, his sole aim was to ascertain the truth, and in the defence of truth, his polemics against what he imagined to be the blindness and insincerity of his critics sometimes assumed a character of harshness and injustice. But, in France at least, these critics were the first to render justice to his learning, his talents and his disinterestedness.

=== The Ancient City ===
The Ancient City: A Study on the Religion, Laws and Institutions of Greece and Rome (French: La Cité antique), published in 1864, is the seminal book of the French historian Numa Denis Fustel de Coulanges (1830–1889). Taking inspiration from René Descartes, and drawing on texts by ancient historians and poets, Fustel investigates the origins of the most archaic institutions in the Greco-Roman world.

== Works ==
- Mémoire sur l'île de Chio, Paris, 1856.
- Quid Vestæ Cultus in Institutis Veterum Privatis Publicisque Valuerit?, T. Jeunet, 1858.
- Polybe ou la Grèce Conquise par les Romains, T. Jeunet, 1858.
- La Cité Antique, Durand, 1864.
- Histoire des Institutions Politiques de l'Ancienne France:
  - La Gaule Romaine.
  - L'Invasion Germanique et la Fin de l'Empire.
  - La Monarchie Franque.
  - L'Alleu et le Domaine Rural pendant l'Époque Mérovingienne.
  - Les Origines du Système Féodal.
  - Les Transformations de la Royauté pendant l'Époque Carolingienne.
- Recherches sur Quelques Problèmes d'Histoire, Paris, Hachette, 1885.
- Nouvelles Recherches sur Quelques Problèmes d'Histoire, Hachette, 1891.
- Questions Historiques, Hachette, 1893.
- Questions Contemporaines, Hachette, 1917 [1st Pub. 1916].
- Leçons à l'Impératrice sur les Origines de la Civilisation Française, Hachette, 1930.

=== Works in English translation ===
- The Ancient City: A Study on the Religion, Laws and Institutions of Greece and Rome, Lee & Shepard, 1877.
- The Origin of Property in Land, Sonnenschein, 1891.
- Polybius and the Roman Conquest of Greece, Invictus Publishing, 2023.

=== Historiography ===
- Les communaux et le domaine à l'époque franque : réponse à m. Fustel de Coulanges, Glasson, Ernest-Désiré; Paris: F. Pichon, 1890.
- Numa-Denis Fustel de Coulanges, Ledos, Eugène-Gabriel; Paris : Revue des Questions historiques, 1890.
- Fustel de Coulanges, Guiraud, Paul; Paris: Hachette, 1896.
- Fustel de Coulanges, Labelle, Eugène; Paris: Bloud, 1913.
- L'histoire des institutions politiques de Fustel de Coulanges, Lazare de Gérin, Richard; Paris: Société française d'éditions littéraires et techniques, E. Malfère, 1936.
- The historical thought of Fustel de Coulanges, Herrick, Jane; Washington, Catholic University of America Press, 1954.
- Le XIXe siècle et l'histoire : le cas Fustel de Coulanges, Hartog, François; Paris: Seuil, 2001.

== See also ==
- Quia Emptores
