= Ivan Ilyin =

Russian political philosopher (1883–1954)

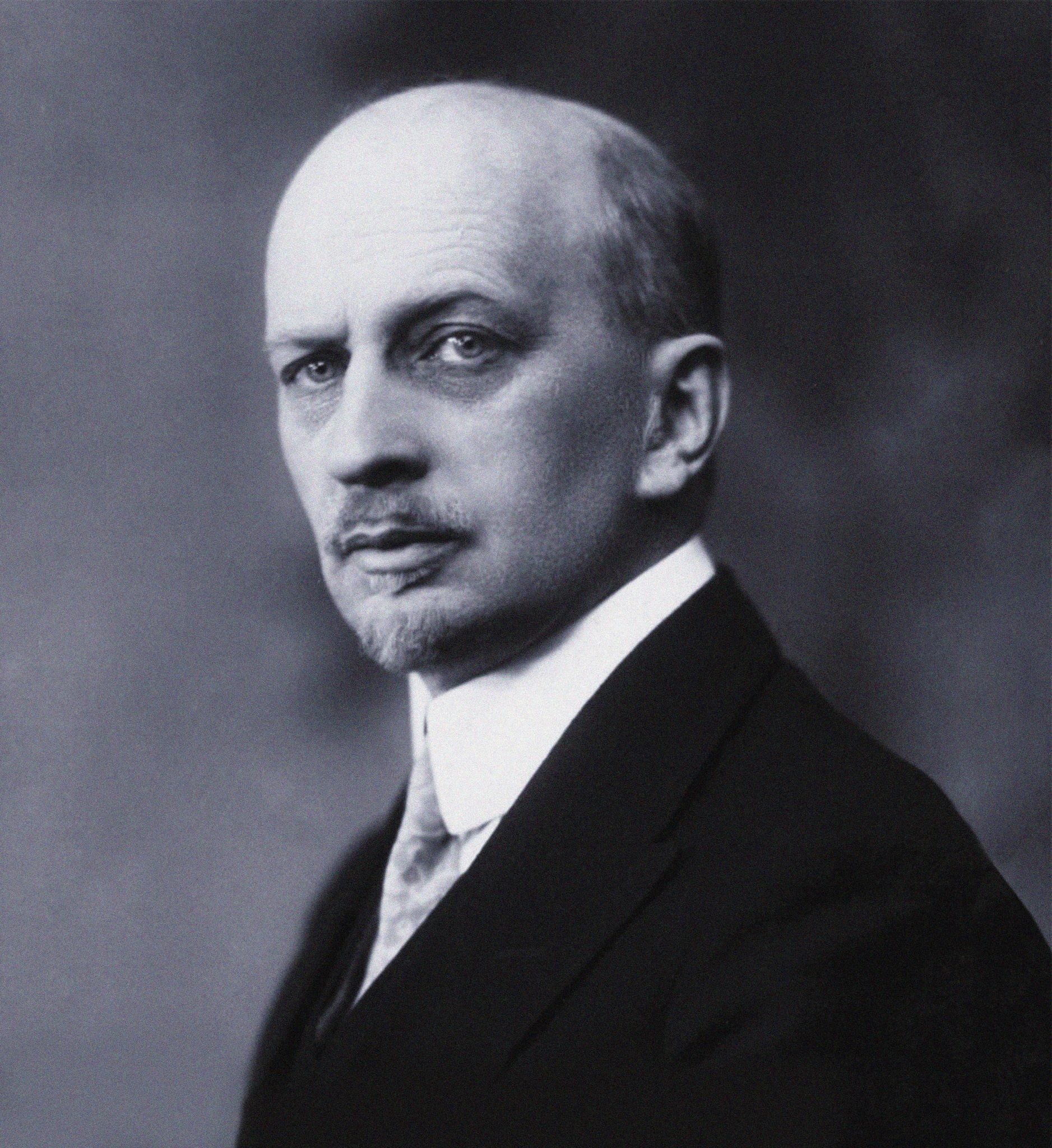
- Born: 9 April 1883; Moscow, Moscow Governorate, Russian Empire
- Died: 21 December 1954 (aged 71); Zollikon, Switzerland

Education
- Education: Moscow State University

Philosophical work
- Era: 20th-century philosophy
- Region: Political and religious philosophy

Ivan Alexandrovich Ilyin (Russian: Иван Александрович Ильин, romanized: Ivan Aleksandrovich Il'in; 9 April [O.S. 28 March] 1883 – 21 December 1954) was a Russian jurist, religious and political philosopher, publicist, orator, and a far-right thinker.

Ilyin began his career as a political writer during the failed 1905 Russian Revolution; by the February Revolution of 1917, which he later saw as a "temporary disorder", he shifted towards liberalism, and by October he became a radical right opponent of democracy. The October Revolution, in his view, marked a "national catastrophe". This conviction led him to oppose the Bolshevik regime. As a white émigré journalist, he aligned himself with Slavophile beliefs and emerging as a key ideologue of the Russian All-Military Union. This organization firmly believed that force stood as the sole means through which the Soviet regime could be toppled.

An anti-communist, he found himself admiring of Italian fascism and Benito Mussolini and initially, sympathetic to Adolf Hitler and Nazism; yet, his attitude critical of totalitarianism, which he distinguished from his own concept of fascism, was not embraced by the Nazi regime. In 1934, his refusal to comply with Nazi directives to spread propaganda led to his dismissal from the Russian Academic Institute, stripping him of employment opportunities. Financial support from Sergei Rachmaninoff in 1938 allowed Ilyin to remain in Switzerland, albeit barred from work or political engagement. This phase of restriction led him to delve deeper into studies encompassing aesthetics, ethics, and psychology.

Despite battling chronic illness, Ilyin wrote over 40 books and numerous articles in Russian and German. His works predominantly revolved around religion and Russia, although he diverged from Vladimir Solovyov's (with whom the Russian religious and philosophical Renaissance of the early 20th century is usually associated) ideology, which advocates a global theocracy. Instead, Ilyin championed a patriarchal model of governance for Russia, rooted on Orthodoxy and faith in the autocratic tsar, distinguishing between autocracy and tyranny. His writings echoed calls for heroism and moral aristocracy, while cementing his role as a proponent of the proposition of existence of Western Russophobia.

Remaining true to Right Hegelianism throughout his life, Ilyin explored themes of statehood, law, and power in world history. He opposed federalism and neutrality, and disdained Western analytic philosophy. As an ultranationalist, Ilyin was a critic of Western-style democracy, advocating instead for a government aligned with Russia's autocratic heritage.

Ilyin's views on Russia's social structure and world history influenced some post-Soviet intellectuals and politicians, including Soviet dissident Aleksandr Solzhenitsyn and Russian president Vladimir Putin.

== Early life ==
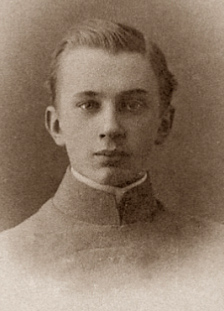
Ilyin in 1901

Ivan Ilyin was born in an aristocratic family claiming Rurikid descent. Ilyin's grandfather was a military man who moved to Moscow, where he became a civil engineer. His last job was as commandant of the Grand Kremlin Palace and gates. His father, Alexander Ivanovich Ilyin (1851-1921), was born and raised in the palace and a lawyer at the Moscow District Court. Ilyin's mother, Caroline Louise née Schweikert (1858-1942), was of German Russian descent and confessing Lutheran. To be able to marry Alexander Ilyin in 1880 she converted to Russian Orthodoxy and took the name Yekaterina Yulyevna.

Ivan Ilyin was brought up in the center of Moscow in Khamovniki District. He was educated at the 1st Moscow Gymnasium in 1901 and entered the Law faculty of the Moscow State University but would rather have studied history. Ilyin wrote as well in German as in Russian and mastered Church Slavonic. He studied Plato's Ideal State and Kant's Thing-in-itself. Ilyin became a political radical during his student days and supported the freedom of assembly. In 1904, he took part in a student march, was arrested, and spent a month in prison. The events of the First Russian Revolution and the October Manifesto were reflected in his pamphlets "Freedom of Assembly and popular Representation" (a way of public participation in politics), "What is a Political Party", "From Russian Antiquity: The Revolt of Stenka Razin". Ilyin produced them under the pseudonym "Nikolai Ivanov".

Under influence of Pavel Novgorodtsev Ilyin became interested in the philosophy of law. (Note: His teacher Novgorodtsev was a prominent representative of liberalism in Russia, briefly imprisoned after signing to Vyborg Manifesto supporting Milyukov who did not trust the Tsar and his Manifesto and refused to co-operate in a government.) In 1906, Ilyin graduated and married Natalia Nikolaevna Vokach (1882-1963) in Bykovo. She was a translator, art-historian and niece of Sergei Muromtsev, a Kadet and chairman of the First Duma. Ilyin worked with Natalia on a translation of "Anarchism" by Paul Eltzbacher and a treatise by Jean-Jacques Rousseau ("Idea of the General will") which were never published. From 1909 he began working as a privatdozent. (In the same year Lenin published his Materialism and Empirio-criticism under the pseudonym Vl. Ilyin).

== Before the revolution ==
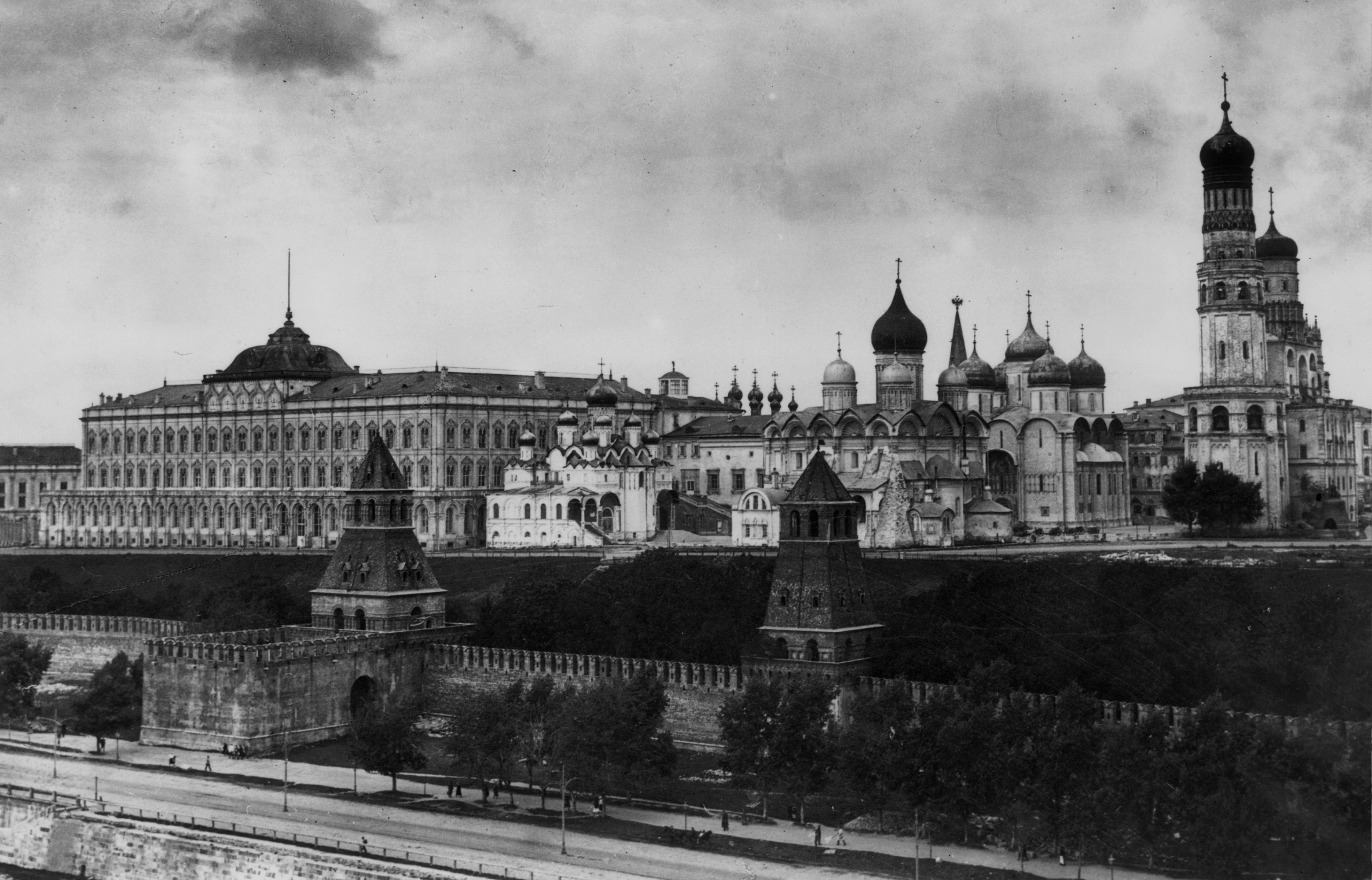
Kremlin Palace and churches, early 1920s

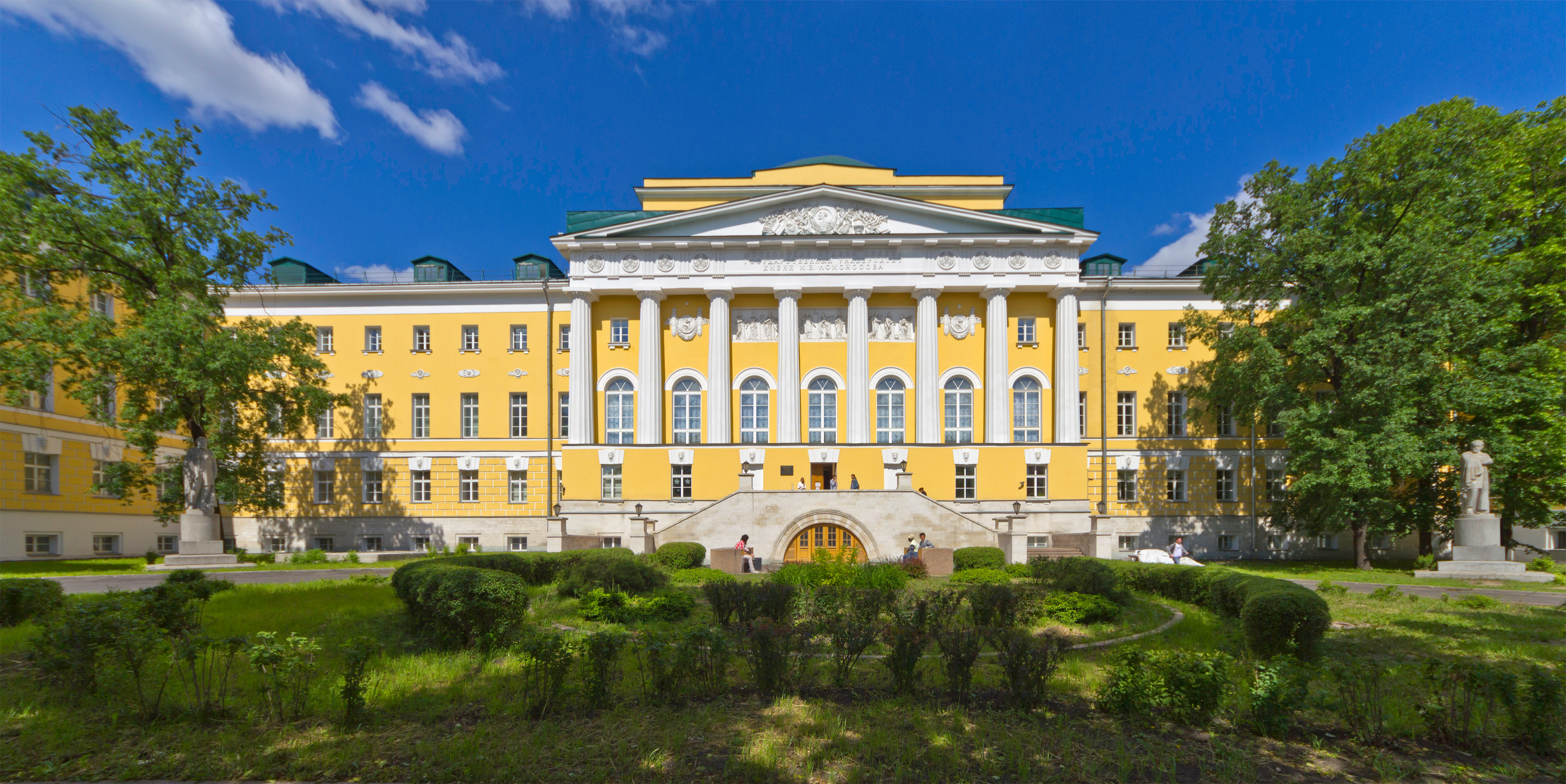
Mokhovaya Street with the old buildings of the Moscow State University

In January 1911, Knyaz Evgenii Troubetzkoy, along with a large group of professors, left Moscow University as a sign of disagreement with the government's violation of the principles of university autonomy. Ilyin moved to Western Europe (Heidelberg, Freiburg, Berlin, Göttingen and Paris) studying the latest trends in European philosophy including: philosophy of life and phenomenology influenced by Husserl, who concentrated on the ideal, essential structures of consciousness; Scheler, who published "The Nature of Sympathy"; Fichte and Schelling on Absolute idealism. Meanwhile, Ilyin worked on his thesis "Crisis of rationalistic philosophy in Germany in the 19th century" which he never finished. In May 1912 he returned to work at the university and delivered a series of lectures called "Introduction to the Philosophy of Law". Novgorodtsev offered to have an Ilyin lecture on the theory of public law at the Moscow Commercial Institute.

Ilyin was known as being extremely intolerant towards Andrei Bely, who called him "mentally insane". For six weeks in 1914 Ilyin and his wife paid visits to Sigmund Freud.

During the July Crisis, Ilyin was forced to leave and his writings were confiscated at the outbreak of the First World War. After returning from Vienna, Ilyin was obsessed with psychoanalysis, diagnosing everything and everyone in Freudian terms, reducing every personal problem to neurotic symptoms, and according to one observer, psychoanalyzing every little gesture of those around him. The two became pioneers of the psychoanalytic movement in Russia. He began to develop a career as a writer and public figure.

== World War I and the Russian Revolution ==
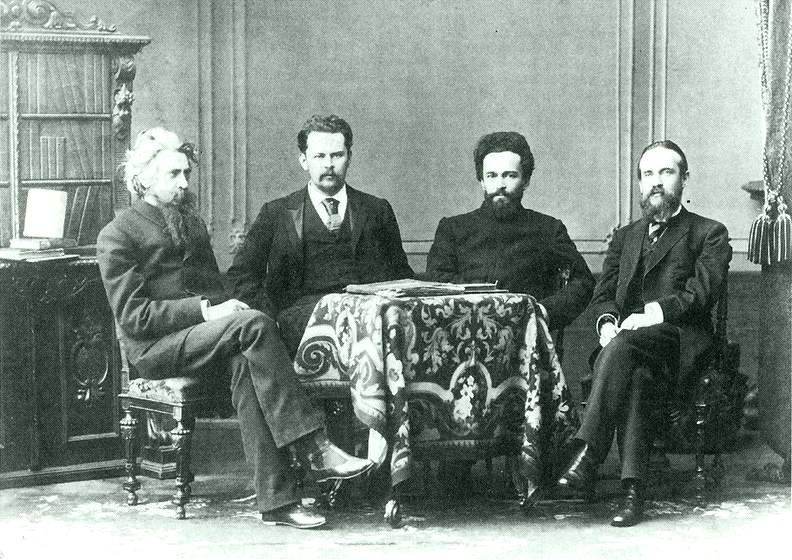
Solovyov, Trubetskoy, Nikolai Grot and Lopatin, the board of a magazine, photographed in 1893. In 1921 Ilyin replaced Lopatin as head of the Moscow Psychological Society.

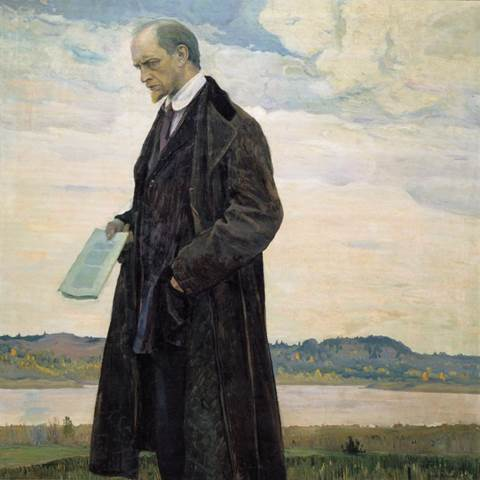
Portrait by Mikhail Nesterov (1921); Ilyin is wearing a coat with a black collar, under the Directoire a sign of mourning for the fate of king, queen, and country. (State Russian Museum, St. Petersburg)

After the breakout of World War I, Evgeny Trubetskoy, once a member of the Party of Peaceful Renovation, arranged a series of public lectures devoted to the "ideology of war". Ilyin contributed to this with several lectures, the first of which was called "The Spiritual Meaning of the War" (1915). He believed that since Russia had already been involved in the war, the duty of every Russian was to support his country to the end. During the April Crisis (1917) he agreed with the Kadet Minister of Foreign Affairs Pavel Milyukov who staunchly opposed Petrograd Soviet demands for peace at any cost. In the summer of 1917, he published the pamphlets "The Party program and maximalism", "On the term of convocation of the Constituent Assembly", "Order or disorder?", "Demagogy and provocation", and "Why not continue the war?"

At first, Ilyin perceived the February Revolution as the liberation of the people. Along with many other intellectuals, he generally approved of it and supported the Russian Provisional Government. However, he was gradually disappointed and by the time the October Revolution had completed, viewed it as a catastrophe. The Moscow State Conference convened by Kerensky's Second Government was attended by actual and former Duma members, representatives of all major political parties, commercial and industrial organizations, the unions, army and academic institutions. Ilyin warned the audience, about 2,600 people, "The revolution turned into self-interested plundering of the state". In the autumn, he wrote under the pseudonym Justus "Where is revolutionary democracy going?", "Mr. Kerensky's refusal", "What to expect?", "Nightmare", and "Who are they?"

In February 1918 Ilyin gave a public lecture on patriotism: the lack among the Russian people of a mature legal consciousness. In March the Treaty of Brest-Litovsk was signed. In April Ilyin was arrested and accused of financially supporting a voluntary army in Moscow and having visited Andrey Avinoff, supporting the Imperial Army. The case was initiated by Felix Dzerzhinsky. The money he had received, Ilyin said, was destined for publishing: "The Philosophy of Hegel as a Doctrine of the Concreteness of God and Humanity". He was in the Butyrka prison dungeons for about a week but developed serious health problems; Ilyin seems to have developed bronchitis that needed treatment. He was released for lack of evidence and allowed to give lectures and defend his thesis. For three weeks Ilyin was bedridden; Novgorodtsev's apartment was searched on the eve of the defence.

On 19 May, Ilyin received two degrees. However, the publisher Lehman-Abrikosov made a generous gesture and offered to publish the two-volume book for free – so Ilyin returned the money to the sponsor Bary & Co. This two-volume dissertation (a provocative interpretation of Hegel) published in the revolutionary chaos of 1918, is considered one of the best commentaries on Hegel's philosophy, also by Vladimir Lenin. (Note: Ilyin's religious, rather than philosophical, attitude is already evident in the very title of his book. He considered Hegel's philosophy in depth, but his depth is not philosophical, but religious.) Even in the preface, Ilyin notes that Hegel is primarily an intuitionist (and not a logician or, even more so, a rationalist), and in the future, all of Ilyin's thought is based on this idea.

He was an opponent of the Russian spelling reform of 1918 and continued to use pre-reform spelling.

Ilyin became a professor of law in Moscow University. As was customary among Russian religious thinkers, he lectured at the Moscow higher women's courses. He was imprisoned between 11 and 24 August, but released with the help of Ivan Yakovlev's son. On 19 December, Ilyin received a summons to appear at a meeting of the Revolutionary Tribunal (non-recognition of Soviet power). In 1919 Ilyin wrote: "In Moscow, the winter is fierce, there is no firewood, we are hungry. They have already taken me to Cheka three times – and tried in a tribunal "for preparing an armed uprising".

Ilyin's ability to hate, despise, insult ideological opponents was particularly pronounced. Ilyin was again imprisoned in 1919, February 1920 and September 1922 for alleged anti-communist activity. He, along with many other "irreconcilable" anti-Bolshevik intellectuals, was condemned to execution, and then forcibly exiled. On 29 September some 160 prominent intellectuals and their families were expelled (at their own expense and not allowed to return without the permission of the Soviet authorities) on a so-called "philosophers' ship" from Petrograd to Stettin, where they arrived on 2 October.

== Emigration ==
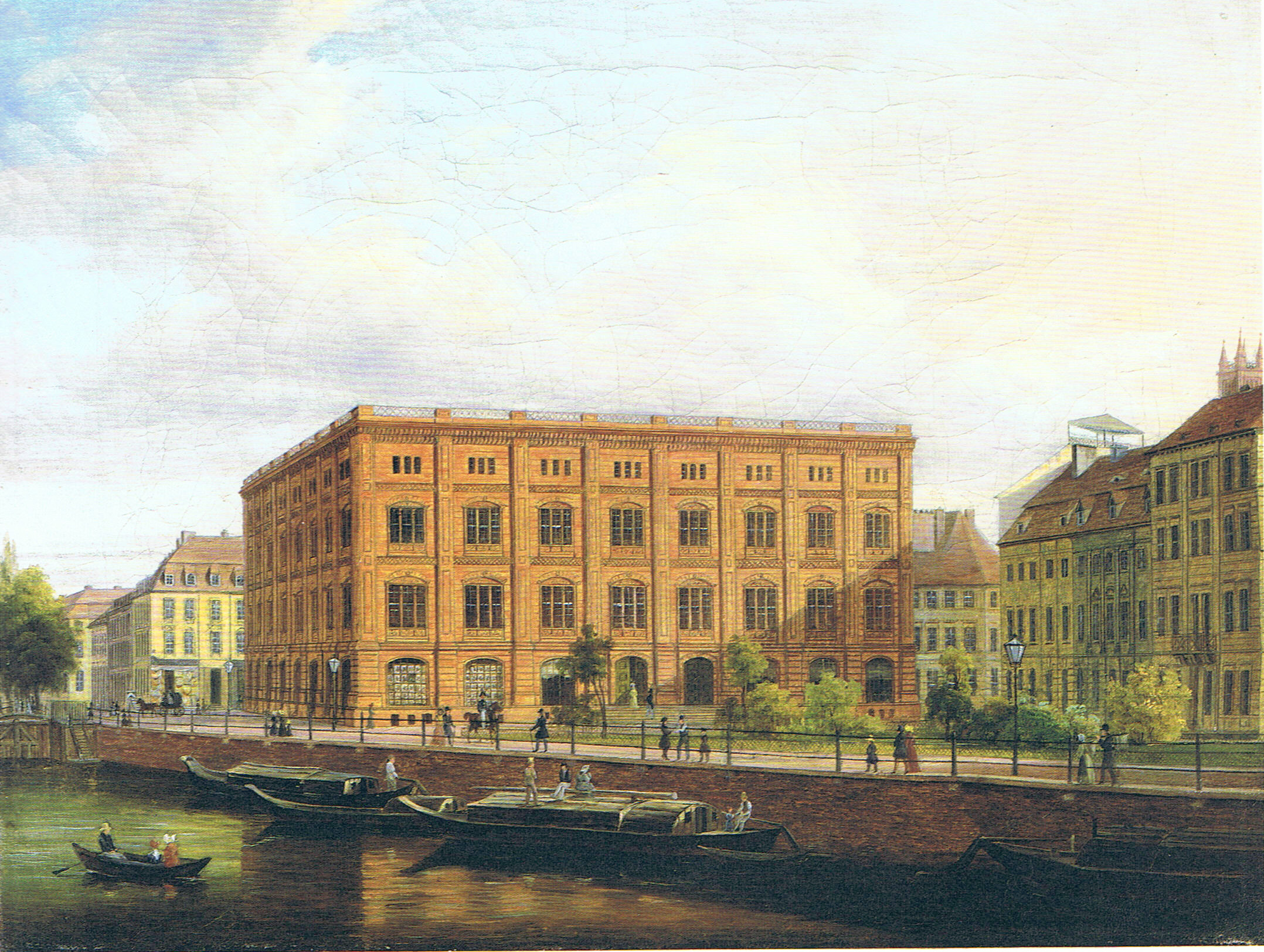
Schinkel's Bauakademie in Berlin, demolished in 1961

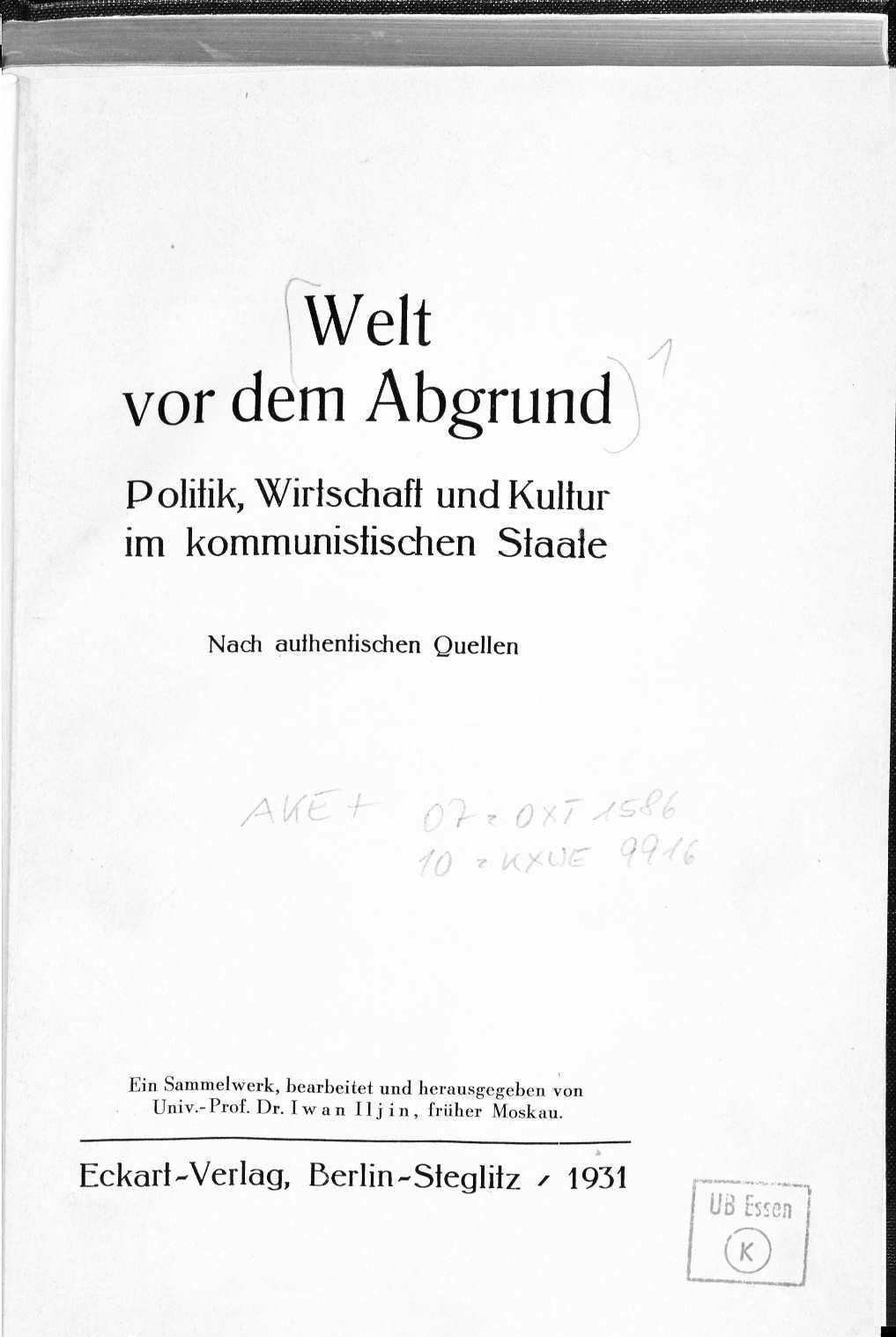
In "Welt vor dem Abgrund" (1931) Ivan Ilyin describes the growing bureaucracy, the terror, and worsening labor conditions in Soviet Russia.

The Treaty of Rapallo (1922) between the German Republic and Soviet Russia opened friendly diplomatic relations. In February 1923, the Russian Scientific Institute (RSI) was founded in Berlin; funded by the YMCA. Ilyin delivered a topical speech "Problems of Modern Legal Consciousness". The RSI wasn't an educational institute; there were occasional lectures on Russian history, literature, law and other areas of Russian culture in Schinkel's Bauakademie. In 1923 Wrangel contacted Ilyin in the hope of arranging enrolment in the Institution for "about 300 of young Russian men ...". In July he lost his Russian citizenship for anti-Soviet activities abroad. It was the notorious year of hyperinflation in the Weimar Republic in October and the failed Beer Hall Putsch in November. The institute was going through a severe financial crisis. Due to invitations from the Czech government and offers from American universities, the number of employees soon thinned significantly. Ilyin briefly cooperated with Nikolai Berdyaev on Russian Religious Renaissance but the philosopher of love moved to Paris and Novgorodtsev moved to Prague.

In 1924, the Russian All-Military Union was founded; Ilyin met Pyotr Wrangel at Seeon Abbey, a center of anti-Bolshevik activities. Wrangel was told to abandon his (military) adventures. Ilyin became part of Wrangel's inner circle; not every Russian was charmed by Wrangel's personality.

In July 1924 Ilyin visited Italy for his health; his portrait of Benito Mussolini was sympathetic but not uncritical.

"... his policy is plastic, prominent: it consists of personal actions, bright, complete, original and often unexpected from the outside; but these personal actions are always at the same time the actions of the masses led by him, and, moreover, organized, and in the course of still being organized, actions. Mussolini has the gift of a political sculptor, the original, completing daring of the Michelangelo tradition.

In his book On resisting evil by force (1925) Ilyin advocated the use of violence in the struggle against Bolshevism, which he regarded as despotism or "left totalitarianism". Ilyin argued that war was sometimes necessary, but never 'just'. Far from supporting holy war, Ilyin in fact wrote that "all my research proves that the sword is not 'holy' and not 'just'." He criticized the anarchist ideology of Tolstoy and pacifist tolstoyism. Ilyin called for the courage to "arrest, condemn, and shoot", which Maxim Gorky called a "gospel of revenge" and Berdyaev compared to a "Cheka of God" and "legalism devoid of grace". For Zinaida Gippius his book was "military field theology"; according to her "this is not a philosopher who writes books, not a publicist who writes feuilletons: it's a man possessed running amok." The book divided the Russian émigrés with its dedication to veterans of the White movement. In 1926 he bitterly wrote about the loss of the Motherland. Ilyin became the unofficial ideologue of the White émigrés who gathered in Paris.

Between 1927 and 1930 Ilyin was a publisher and editor of the journal Russkiy Kolokol. He actively published in right-wing conservative newspapers.

During the 1920s more than 300,000 Russians lived in Berlin. There were three daily newspapers and five weeklies. Seventeen Russian publishing houses had sprung up within a single year. Ilyin lectured in Germany and other European countries and would give 200 speeches. In 1930 the National Alliance of Russian Solidarists was founded in Belgrade and became popular in France. It rejected both Bolshevism and liberal capitalism and embraced Russian patriotism.

In 1932 only about 60,000 Russian emigrants were living in Germany and in Berlin the number of émigrés was 8,320. The activity of the RSI gradually slowed down due to a decrease in the number of Russian-speaking students. There were difficulties in maintaining this large institution, and it was liquidated. It became impossible to be employed as either a writer or a lecturer.

=== Nazi Germany ===
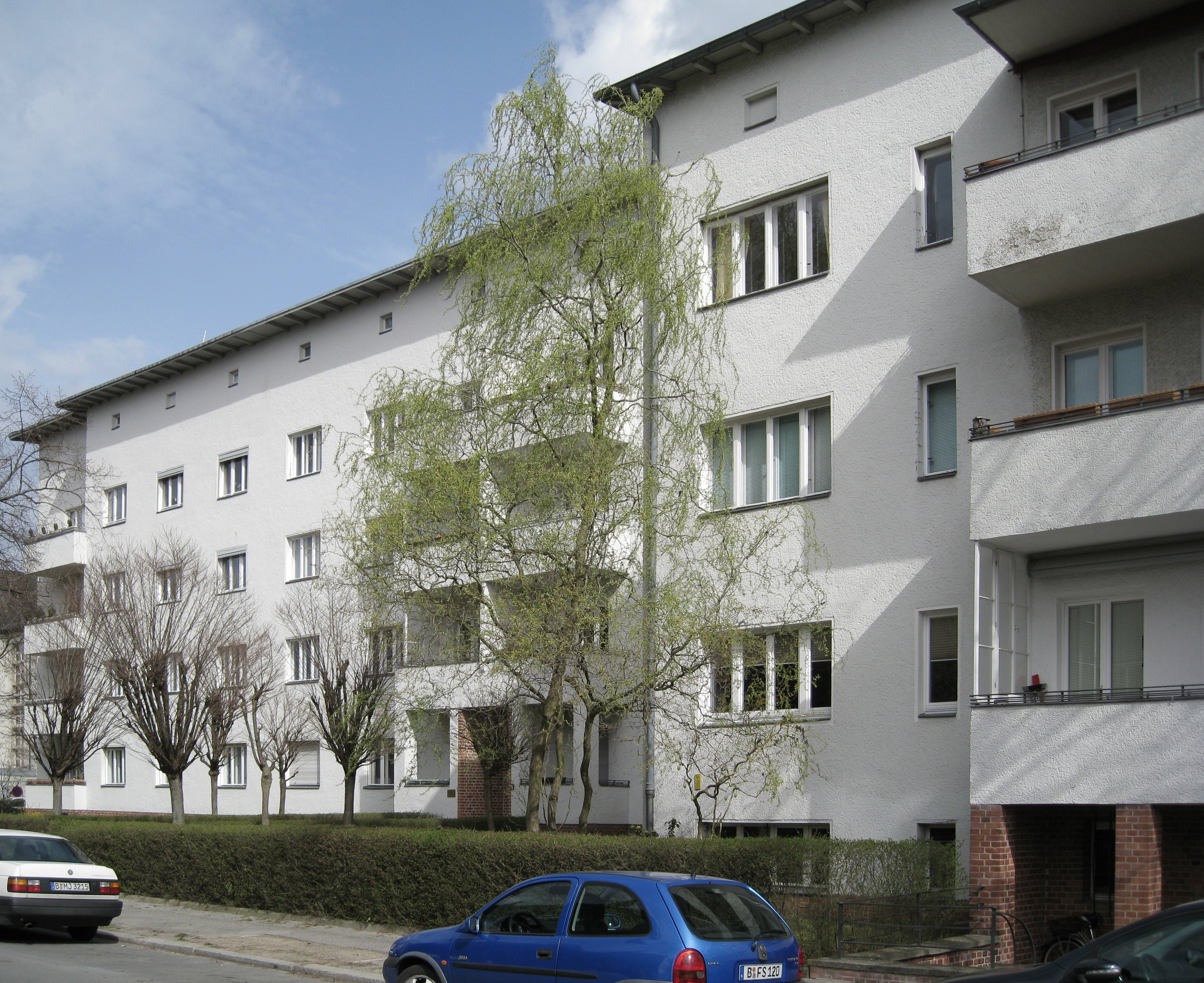
Ilyin lived at Sodener Straße, Berlin-Wilmersdorf

On 27 February 1933, the Reichstag building was set on fire. Göring blamed a communist plot and the Reichstag Fire Decree suspended civil liberties, leading to the arrest of about 1,500 people, mostly Communists.

Beginning on 7 April the Law for the Restoration of the Professional Civil Service required an Aryan certificate for public emplyees. Like many Russian émigrés, Ilyin initially interpreted the Nazi seizure of power primarily through the lens of anti-communism. On 11 April, Ilyin handed the Ministry of Internal Affairs a memorandum entitled "Directives of the Comintern for the Bolshevisation of Germany," consisting of hundreds of excerpts from Comintern documents that had been published in the press. (Note: Nachrichtenstelle im Reichsministerium des Innern to Auswärtige Amt, April 19, 1933. BA Berlin R58/3199, Bl. 22. The letter notes that the "methods and means through which the Comintern operates in Germany" were not revealed by the author.) According to A.F. Kiselyov, the memorandum appears to have been an attempt to demonstrate Ilyin's anti-communist credentials to the new authorities. Ilyin confessed that he literally forced himself to read Lenin's works, the materials of party congresses and plenums, the Comintern, and the Soviet press.

In April, Ilyin briefly established contact with young Russian National Socialists. On 2 May, a committee was founded with Ilyin on its presidium, though cooperation never took off since Ilyin scorned the Russian radicals. On 17 May, Ilyin published in "Vozrojdénie" his infamous article "National Socialism. A New Spirit", in which he welcomed Hitler's rise to power as a barrier against Bolshevism. In June, Ilyin became acting head of the Russian Scientific Institute.

On 13 July, all German public employees were required to use the Hitler salute. As head of the Russian Scientific Institute, Ilyin was thus expected to conform to the new rituals of the Nazi state. On 14 July, the Nazi Party was declared the only legal political party in Germany. Russian immigrants feared that Hitler, who on various occasions had spoken out strongly against foreigners, would begin persecuting them.

On 5 August 1933, Ilyin's house was searched, his correspondence examined, and he was taken away for interrogation. After questioning, he was released, but only after signing a declaration. In September, the newly created Reich Chamber of Culture was established. The Russian Scientific Institute was transferred to Reich Ministry of Propaganda headed by Joseph Goebbels. Adolf Ehrt, a leading figure in the Anti-Komintern, sought to involve several prominent Russian émigrés—including Ilyin, Vonsiatsky and Kazembek, the leader of the Mladorossi, in his anti-Soviet activities.

In March 1934 Ilyin was accused being a Freemason in an anonymous pamphlet. On 9 July, Ehrt demanded that the professors of the institute actively participate in Nazi propaganda; Ilyin refused and was dismissed. Ilyin denounced the racial policy of Nazi Germany and replied in a letter he had long wanted to retire and devote himself to science. From August 1934 onward, Ilyin was left without a salary and increasingly isolated from official academic life in Germany.

In 1935, Ilyin spent much of the summer at a dacha in rural Latvia rented by the artist Evgeny Klimov. Under the pseudonym Alfred Norman, he published "The Bolshevik Policy of World Domination", his last active political statement. In 1936, Hitler appointed Vasily Biskupsky head of the Russische Vertrauensstelle, the government body dealing with the Russian émigré community. Ilyin publicly criticized in the press Alexander Lvovich Kazembek.

In February 1937, during a speech in Riga marking the centenary of Pushkin's death, Ilyin praised Pushkin's work as "the main entrance to Russian culture". He also applied for membership of the Reich Chamber of literature. Because het could not identify all of his great-grandparents, he initially encountered difficulties obtaining the required Aryan certificate, but Ehrt interfered and his application was accepted.

In December 1937, Ilyin published his pamphlet "An attack on the Orthodox church" in which he accused Nietzsche of paving the way for Bolshevism and Stalinism. and Stalinism. The Gestapo confiscated the work, banned him from the Reich Chamber of Culture and prohibited him from engaging in independent political activity. In May 1938, Ilyin decided to leave Germany, but the Berlin police initially refused him permission to depart. In an effort to obtain permission, he declared on June 17: I am ready to testify under oath that I and my wife are the purest Aryans and that I have never belonged to Masonic or affiliated organizations anywhere." (Note: Refusing to cooperate with the German Catholic or Evangelical Protestant church Ilyin was regarded by the Nazis as a Freemason.)

In early July, he was granted permission to travel to Karlovy Vary for treatment of his migraine, but instead he went to Munich with all his manuscripts. In August, he applied to settle in Switzerland as a scholar and philosopher, and to promote his theory on art. Travelling on a Nansen passport, he visited a congress in Locarno. With financial assistance from Sergei Rachmaninoff, he was able to post bail, and settle in Switzerland, although he was forbidden to work or participate in Swiss politics. On 17 September he wrote to Ivan Shmelev that his furniture and library arrived.

=== Switzerland ===
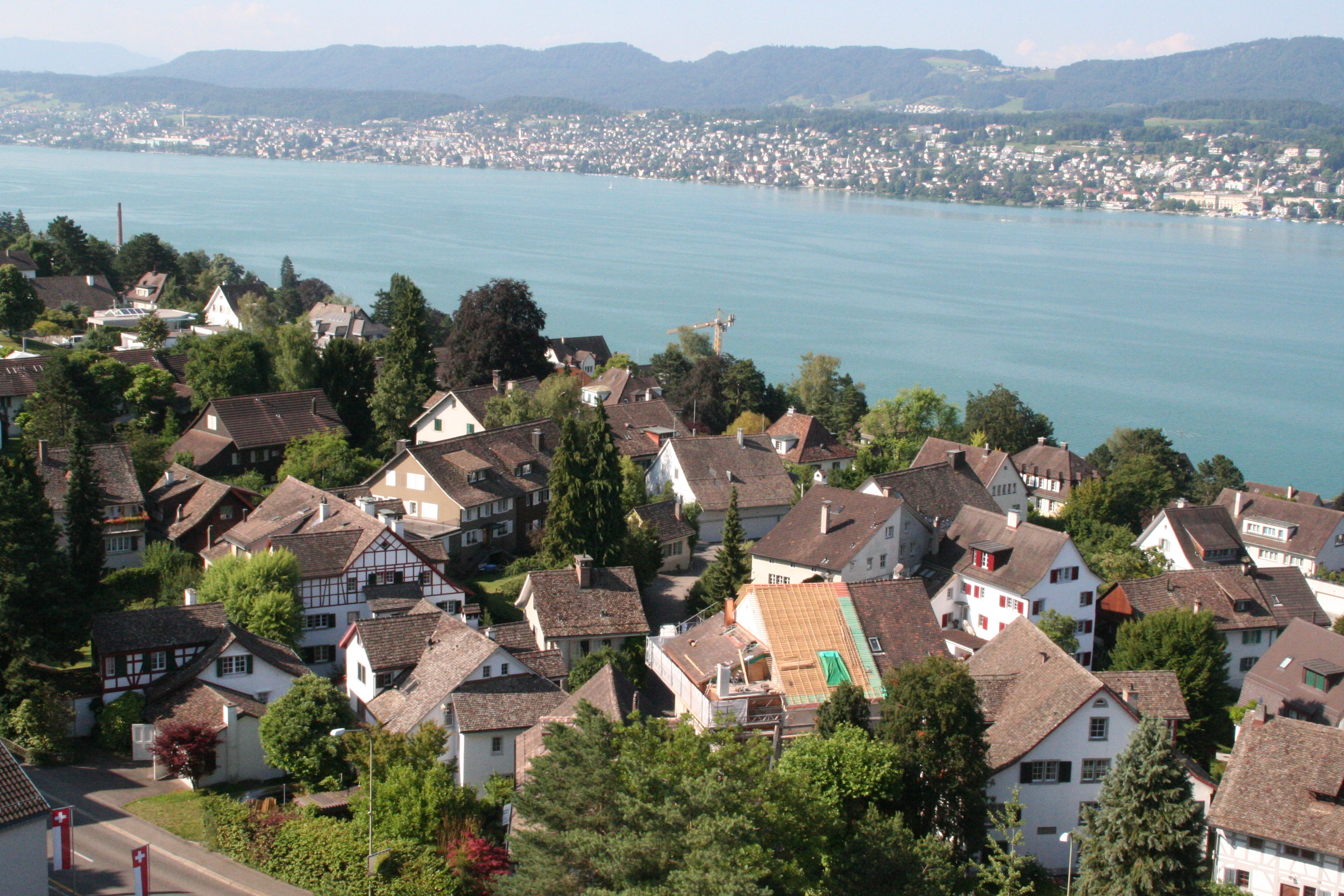
Ilyin lived at Alte Landstrasse 12 and Zollikerstrasse 33.

From 1940 Ilyin resided stateless in the village of Zollikon near Lake Zürich and corresponded with the composer and pianist Nikolai Medtner. He published in local newspapers and lectured on Russian literature at folk high schools, which was not considered paid work. There was no danger from Ilyin's lectures, according to an expert opinion issued by the Swiss Army Command in 1942. They were "national in the sense that it is directed against the whole of the West". In November 1943 he refused to cooperate with the Russian Liberation Army. In 1946 Ilyin stated he was never a Hegelian, as he himself expressed in the introduction to the German translation of his theses, a revised version of "Die Philosophie Hegels als kontemplative Gotteslehre". In 1949 he and his wife received permanent citizenship. In his 1950 essay, "What Dismemberment of Russia Entails for the World", Ilyin predicted the fall of the Soviet Union and gave instructions on how to save Russia from the evils of the Western world.

At the end of his life, Ilyin managed to finish and publish a work on which he worked for more than 33 years, Axioms of Religious Experience, and three volumes of philosophical and literary prose, originally written in German.

He died in a hospital on 21 December 1954. In 1956, his postwar articles were compiled into a two-volume anthology called Our Tasks. It is about the future of Russia and its State, once freed of Communism. He did not describe this future very clearly, it is something bright, good, but blurry, according to the literary critic Alexander N. Arkhangelsky.

== Personal life ==
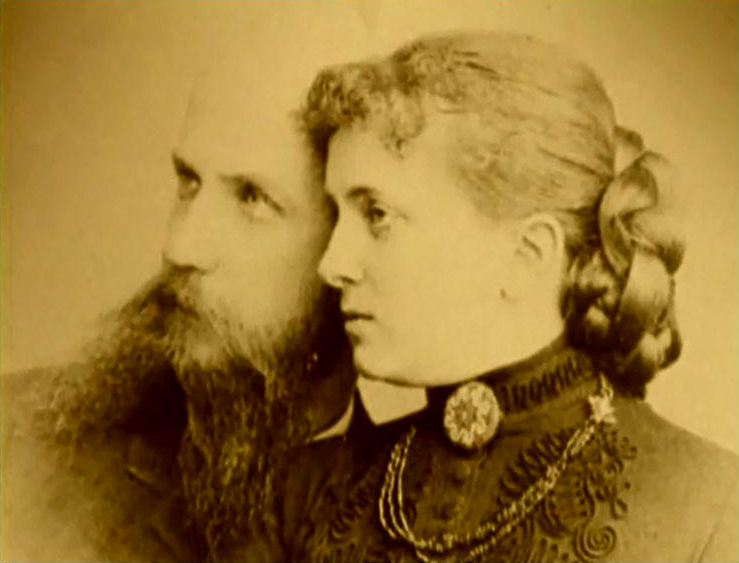
Ivan Ilyin's parents. His mother died on the estate "Ilyinka".

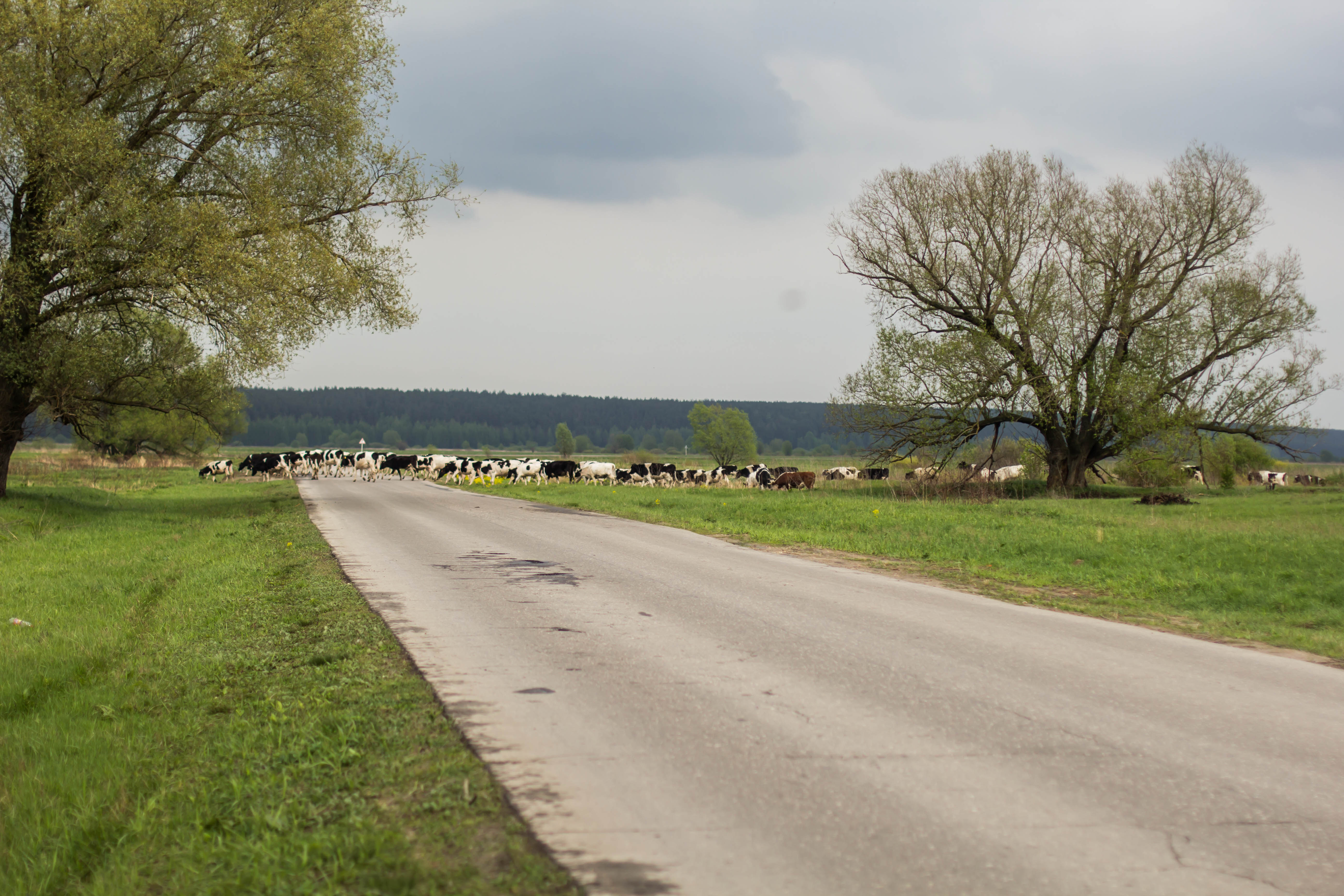
Spassky District, Ryazan Oblast

=== Family ===
The Ilyin family owned a dairy farm 260 km from Moscow in Bolshye Polyany (Ryazan Governorate), where they spent the summers. Ilyin had four brothers: Alexey, Alexander, Julius, and Igor. In 1905 Alexey joined the Socialist Revolutionary Party but died in 1913. Alexander was a zemstvo warden but moved to America before the revolution. Igor, a lawyer, was arrested on charges of "counter-revolutionary agitation" by Stalin's NKVD in the Moscow region. He was executed and buried at Butovo firing range. Ilyin's cousin Mikhail Ilyin was an art historian, involved in the design of Dobryninskaya, a Moscow metro station.

=== Marriage ===
In summer 1906 (just after graduating), Ilyin married Nataliia Nikolaevna Vokach (1882–1963). Her father was a Moscow attorney, and her uncle was a scholar of Roman law and an activist in the cause of constitutional government in Russia. In 1938/1955 N.N. Ilyina published "The Expulsion of the Normans from Russian history". The marriage was a long and happy one. Ilyin dedicated most of his principal works to Nataliia Nikolaevna. The couple had no children.

== Political writings ==
In exile, Ivan Ilyin argued that Russia should not be judged by what he called the Communist danger it represented at that time but should look forward to a future in which it would liberate itself with the help of Christian fascism. (Already according to Machiavelli: religious zeal must necessarily be combined with patriotism.) Starting from his 1918 thesis on Hegel's philosophy, he authored many books on political, social and spiritual topics on the historical mission of Russia. One of the problems he worked on was the question: what eventually led Russia to the tragedy of the revolution? He answered that the reason was "the weak, damaged spiritual self-esteem" of Russians. As a result, mutual distrust and suspicion between the state and the people emerged. The authorities and nobility constantly misused their power, subverting the unity of the people. Ilyin thought that any state must be established as a corporation in which a citizen is a member with certain rights and certain duties. Therefore, Ilyin recognized the inequality of people as a necessary state of affairs in any country. But that meant that educated upper classes had a special duty of spiritual guidance towards uneducated lower classes. This did not happen in Russia.

"And so fairness in no way requires equality. It requires inequality based on the subject. Children should be sheltered and treasured; this gives them a variety of fair privileges. The weak must be pardoned. The tired deserves leniency. The weak-willed need more strictness. To the honest and sincere more trust should be given. The loose-lipped call for caution. From the gifted person, it is fair to require more. Heroes are worthy of honor, to which the non-hero should not lay claim. And in the same manner, in all things and forever ..."

The other point was the wrong attitude towards private property among common people in Russia. Ilyin wrote that many Russians believed that private property and large estates are gained not through hard labor but through power and maladministration of officials. Therefore, the property becomes associated with dishonest behavior.

History, Ilyin believes, shows that the Russian people have always been prone to property redistribution and waited only for an opportunity to realize their aspirations. This happened in 1917, when "the war with terrible setbacks shook confidence in the military command, and then in the throne". After the abdication of the Emperor the people were at the mercy of left-wing parties, which "carried the unleashed soldier, sailor and peasant the right to disorder, the right to autocracy, the right to desert, the right to seize other people's property, all those disenfranchised, destructive, imaginary rights that the Russian commoner always dreamed of in his anarchist-bourgeois instinct and which were now given to him from above."

=== Monarchism and the concept of legal consciousness ===
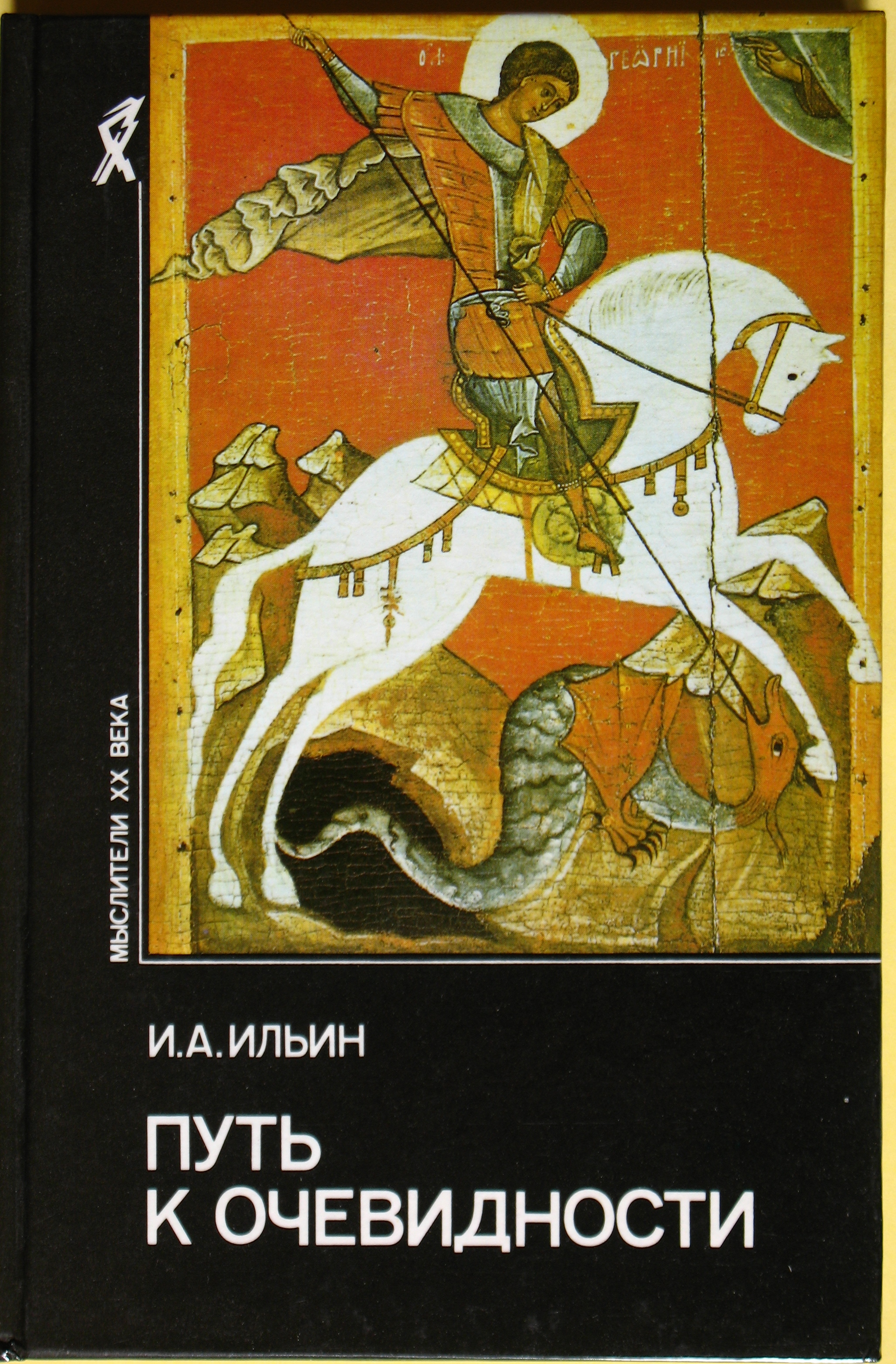
Thinkers of the 20th century: Ilyin Ivan

The key concept of Ilyin's legal philosophy was legal consciousness (правосозна́ние, pravosoznanie) which he understood as an ability of an individual and of the society as a whole to respect the law and to obey it willingly, to defer to authority, and to other citizens. Ilyin derived the concept of law from the Hegelian idea of the spirit and asserted that:

"Law in its original, "natural" sense is nothing other than a necessary form of the spiritual being of a human. It indicates that order of equal, free self-sufficiency of each in which alone spiritual life is possible on earth."

Legal consciousness, therefore, is "already given in embryo to each person". Positive law, then, is a way to shape transcendental norms of law present in legal consciousness. Ilyin distinguishes between a "correct" legal consciousness based on conservatism, morality and religion and a "formalist" legal consciousness that considers only the posited, rationalized law which, therefore, gives no clue to understanding what is law. According to Ilyin, mature legal consciousness is always rooted in Christian ethics and monarchism, the monarchy being the natural realization of the Divine providence. Monarchic legal consciousness tends to perceive the state as a family and unite the citizens with family bonds, while the monarch becomes not only the legal but also the spiritual ruler. His ideal was a monarch who would rule for the good of the country, would not belong to any party, and would embody the union of all people, whatever their beliefs. To serve this monarch is not an act of submission but rather of conscious and free choice of a responsible citizen. To the contrary, the republican legal consciousness praises individual freedom, social climbing and disregard for authority and is eager for radical changes. People view the state not as a family, but rather as a danger that needs to be contained with checks and balances. Democratic elections, according to Ilyin, tend to elevate sneaky and evasive politicians. Ilyin repeatedly condemned the totalitarian state and emphasized the need to develop a form of 'legal consciousness' among the population. In his 1949 article, Ilyin argued against both totalitarianism and "formal" democracy in favor of a "third way" of building a state in Russia: "Facing this creative task, appeals of foreign parties to formal democracy remain naive, light-minded and irresponsible."

Ilyin left an unfinished work on monarchy, which used Hegel's concept of world history. In it he wrote that each nation has its own unique, organic path of self-preservation. Ilyin praised the Russian monarchy of the 19th century which he deemed consistent with his ideas and not absolute but essentially limited by religious and moral norms, and criticized Nicholas II for his abdication, eventually leading to the abolition of monarchy in Russia. On Monarchy and Republic was supposed to consist of twelve chapters but Ilyin died having written the introduction and seven chapters which were published in 1978.

Paul Valliere wrote that Ilyin can certainly be exonerated of the charge that he proposed to induce virtue by force, like Tomás de Torquemada or Robespierre as Ilyin explicitly rejected this idea. He can also be exonerated of the charge of advocating holy war, although his position bears a resemblance to holy war in certain respects.

One way to characterize Ilyin's political outlook is to apply the label that Ilyin's political mentor, Petr Struve, applied to himself: "liberal conservative". One might object that Ilyin's call for an "ideologically liberal dictatorship" is a contradiction in terms because any talk of dictatorship negates liberalism. On the other hand, there is a cluster of liberal values at the core of Ilyin's political thought.

Ilyin elaborated these views in writings that were eventually published posthumously. On the Essence of Legal Consciousness was written between 1916 and 1918 influenced by the writings of Novgorodtsev and Bogdan Kistyakovski and was published in 1956.

=== Eurasianism ===
Drawing on historical, geographical, ethnographical, linguistic, musicological and religious studies, the Eurasianists suggested that the lands of the Russian Empire, and then of the Soviet Union, formed a natural unity, making Russia a distinct civilization, neither European nor Asian but Eurasian, according to Paul Robinson. A key feature of Eurasianism is the rejection of Russian ethnic nationalism that seeks a purely Slavic state. Aversion to democracy is also an important characteristic of Eurasianism. Unlike many of the white Russians, the Eurasianists rejected all hope for a restoration of the monarchy. One of the key figures was Nikolai Trubetzkoy. Another participant was Vladimir Nikolaevich Ilyin (1890-1974), a philosopher, theologian and composer from Kyiv. The latter seems not related to Ivan A. Ilyin who has been presented in the literature by various authors as belonging to the group. The first Eurasianists were mostly pacifist émigrés, and their vision of the future had features of romanticism and utopianism. The goal of the Eurasianists was the unification of the main Christian churches under the leadership of the Russian Orthodox Church.

In March 1922 Lenin insisted on a final and speedy reprisal against the Russian Orthodox Church, which was considered a hotbed of internal "counter-revolution". The Politburo sought to remove Buddhism and other religions, as they believed that a lack of religion (State atheism) combined with urbanization would result in an increase in production. In April 1925 League of Militant Atheists was formed under the ideology of the communist Party.

In October 1925 the Eurasianists held a congress in Prague with the intention of creating a seminar. In the late 1920s, Eurasianists polarized and became divided into two groups: the left Eurasianists, who were becoming increasingly pro-Soviet and pro-communist and the classic right Eurasianists, who remained staunchly anti-communist and anti-Soviet. The Eurasianists faded quickly from the Russian émigré community; N. Trubetzkoy and V.N. Ilyin left. For Ivan Ilyin, however, eurasianism was "mental subterfuge".

=== Ukraine ===
Ilyin's chauvinistic views on Ukraine were typical of Russian White émigrés. (Note: In 1908 the historian Pavel Milyukov, a former schoolmate of Ilyin, considered the "Russia for Russians" slogan to have been "a slogan of disunity... [and] not creative but destructive.") Unlike Alfred Rosenberg, who was in favor of collaboration with the East Slavs against Bolshevism and offered them national independence, Ukrainian independence was anathema to him. In 1934, Ilyin stated he was "in no way sympathetic to either conversations or plans for the separation of Ukraine". He saw it as one of the reasons he lost his job at the institute.

In 1938, in a short but significant article, Ilyin wrote: "Little Russia and Great Russia are bound together by faith, tribe, historical destiny, geographical location, economy, culture and politics", and predicted: "History has not yet said its last word".

Ilyin disputed that an individual could choose his nationality any more than cells can decide whether they are part of a body.

=== Fascism ===
An opponent of democracy from the right, from the 1920s Ilyin manifested his commitment to fascism in his writings, such as the series of essays Letters on Fascism. These essays were focused mainly on Italian fascism and the personality of Benito Mussolini, which Ilyin treated as heroic, and defended fascist dictatorship as a necessary bulwark to prevent a civil war in Italy. Ilyin's essays presented his own concept of Russian fascism, which he connected to the White movement, described by him as a global phenomenon of resistance to the "devil" of Bolshevism and termed as much "broader and deeper" than fascism; thus, fascism was a "method" of the global "White movement", in which the "White idea" gained the utmost "quality"; according to Ilyin, "Fascism is a beginning of service and sacrifice, not of proselytism, not of running and not of acquisition." Ilyin intended the ROVS to follow the path of Russian fascism promoted by him and noted that Russian fascism should be embodied in an organization of professional military men rather than a popular party due to the inability of the latter to achieve power in Russia.

His 1928 article On Russian Fascism is about the fascist "method" of dealing with the "Bolshevik plague". Fascism is the Italian secular variation of the white movement. The Russian white movement is "more perfect" than fascism "due to its religious component".

Fascism emerged as a reaction to Bolshevism, as a concentration of state-protective forces on the right. During the onset of leftist chaos and leftist totalitarianism, this was a healthy, necessary and inevitable phenomenon. This concentration will continue, even in the most democratic states: in the hour of national danger, the healthy forces of the people will always concentrate in the direction of security and dictatorship. So it was in ancient Rome, so it was in new Europe, and so it will continue to be.

Ilyin looked at Mussolini and Hitler as exemplary leaders who were saving Europe by dissolving democracy.

On 17 May 1933, Ilyin published in the Paris newspaper "Vozrojdénie" an infamous article titled "National Socialism. A New Spirit" in support of the takeover of Germany by Nazis, in which he accused Berliner Tageblatt, the Vossische Zeitung, and the Frankfurter Zeitung of being pro-Bolshevik newspapers. (Recently the Nazi book burnings had taken place.) Ilyin bitterly attacked the "Jewish bourgeois press" of Weimar Germany, which he accused of being pro-Soviet and never telling the truth about Russia.

"I categorically refuse to view the events of the last three months in Germany from the point of view of German Jews... What is happening in Germany is a huge political and social upheaval... What did Hitler do? He stopped the process of Bolshevization in Germany and rendered the greatest service to the whole of Europe ... the liberal-democratic hypnosis of non-resistance was thrown off. While Mussolini leads Italy and Hitler leads Germany, European culture is given a reprieve."

In September the Reich Chamber of Culture was established. When the Berlin Institute was placed under Reich Ministry of Public Enlightenment and Propaganda in October not only the Jews but also Ilyin lost his job as head of the institute because he refused to incorporate Nazi propaganda into his courses. Ilyin noted the Nazi government's assault on the civil rights of German Jews but did not regard those measures as a sufficient reason for calling the entire German fascist project into question. When he was asked to join the anti-Jewish propaganda Ilyin refrained from following it. In July, the Ministry of Propaganda adopted the new statutes which made impossible the teaching activities to foreigners, and Ilyin had to resign from the Institute due to his lack of German citizenship; still, the new director of the institute Adolf Ehrt wrote to Ilyin that he did not reject further cooperation with Ilyin on specific occasions. The initial support proved to be short-lived: he had fallen victim to Émigré denunciations, which prompted the search of his house by police and subsequent interrogation. In a letter to Ivan Shmelyov, dated 7 August 1934, Ilyin wrote: "At the beginning of July, I was dismissed along with all my other compatriots from the position I had occupied for 12 years — dismissed for being Russian patriot.

On August 5, Ilyin's house was searched, his letters were looked over, and he was taken away for interrogation, where he was asked about his source of income and for details of the people abroad with whom he corresponded. Upon release, the German police required him to sign a declaration: "I am aware that if I "engage in politics", I will be sent to a concentration camp. To this I have added a distinct point, to the effect that the authorities themselves provide me with inducement through their anti-communist mission."

Ilyin initially saw Adolf Hitler as a defender of civilization from Bolshevism and approved of the way Hitler had, in his view, derived his anti-communism and antisemitism from the ideology of the Russian Whites. However, when Nazi Germany declared the Slavs to be inferior Untermenschen (subhumans), Ilyin was offended. Ilyin's admiration for early fascism, his arguments for a strong state, organically connected to the people, and his assertion that "at the head of the state, there must be a single will" have inevitably produced comparisons with his German counterpart Carl Schmitt.

In 1948, Ilyin in his work "On Fascism" gives a series of justifications for fascism and sums it up at the end of his work:

"Fascism is a complex phenomenon: it is multifaceted and historically speaking, far from exhausted. Within it, one finds elements of health and illness, old and new, protection and destruction. Therefore in an evaluation of fascism fair-mindedness and equanimity are needed. But its dangers must be considered in full.

Fascism arose as a reaction to Bolshevism, as a concentration of power guarding sovereignty from the Right. As leftist chaos and totalitarianism advanced, this was a healthy phenomenon, as well as necessary and unavoidable. And such a concentration will come about henceforth, even in the most democratic states: in an hour of national danger, the more vigorous forces of the people will always rally to the defense of sovereignty. Thus it was in ancient Rome and the new Europe, and so it shall be hereafter.

Standing against leftist totalitarianism, fascism was correct, as it sought just socio-political reform. This quest could be successful or unsuccessful: solving such problems is difficult, and first attempts might not have made any headway. But to meet the wave of socialist psychosis- through social and consequently anti-socialist measures- was imperative. These measures had long been imminent, and waiting any further was out of the question.

Finally, fascism was right since it derived from a healthy national-patriotic sensibility, without which a people can neither lay claim to its existence nor create a unique culture.

He wrote in "On Fascism":

"The greatest mistake of fascism was the revival of idolatrous Caesarism. "Caesarism" is the exact opposite of monarchism. Franco and Salazar have understood this and are trying to avoid these mistakes. They don't call their regime "fascist". Let's hope that Russian patriots will think through the mistakes of fascism and national socialism to the end and not repeat them."

A number of Ilyin's works (including those written after the Italian and German defeats in 1945) advocated fascism. "Italian fascism expressed in its own, Roman way the things that Russia had for centuries been standing on," he wrote in 1948. A year later Roman Gul accused Ilyin of antisemitism: "I still have among the clippings your pro-Hitler article where you recommend the Russians not to look at Hitlerism "through the eyes of Jews" and sing the praises of this movement!" Ilyin would describe Nazis as those who had "walked the path of Anti-Christ."

According to Timothy D. Snyder, Ilyin's ideas are a hodgepodge of German idealism, psychoanalysis, Italian fascism, and Christianity. Some of his work has a rambling and commonsensical character, and it is easy to find tensions and contradictions. Attempts to identify him as 'Putin's philosopher' by citing selective quotations from Ilyin are usually misleading.

... in a somewhat sensationalist op-ed in the New York Times, Timothy Snyder attempts to discover the ideological foundations of the current Russian regime. In doing so, he exaggerates the influence on Putin of books by Ivan Ilyin, the ideologist of the Whites, the counterrevolutionary émigrés of the 1920s and '30s.

Paul Valliere, professor of Religion, at Butler University, wrote "Like Hegel, Ilyin was a statist and a monarchist, but to deny that liberal values occupied a central place in his political thought is a mistake. For the same reason, it is a mistake to call Ilyin a "fascist philosopher". Ilyin's thought never manifested such signal features of fascism as populism, totalitarianism, racism, anti-Semitism, thuggery, or the politics of hysteria. One may criticize Ilyin severely for not recognizing the catastrophic vices of fascism from the start." After the attack on Milyukov and Nabokov in 1922 he warned Struve against the extreme Markov.

Paul Robinson (University of Ottawa Faculty of Social Sciences), the author of the book "Russian Conservatism", points out if you want to find a fascist Ilyin, you can. But if you want to find a liberal one, you can do that too. Ilyin considered that fascism had some positive characteristics, as well as some negative ones, but to be a Western European ideology and as such inappropriate for Russia.

Nevertheless, there are some problems with the approach used in the research on Il'in in "The Road to Unfreedom". Snyder uses quotes from the philosopher's work to show how Il'in's ideas fit into, or more accurately, provide a frame for Putin's regime. To accomplish this, he mixes Il'in's earliest works with very late ones. This is a very problematic choice, for Il'in, as Snyder has himself stated, drastically shifted his political opinions during his life. At the same time, serving the task of his book, Snyder in most cases gives no historical context to the quotes he provides and gives no explanation of where Il'in stands compared to other Russian-emigre thinkers of his time. This approach, I believe, causes misinterpretation in the worst case, or incomplete understanding of the legacy of Ivan Il'in in the best case.

David G. Lewis argues against such view:

Nevertheless, it is difficult to agree with Paul Robinson's characterisation of Ivan Ilyin as a 'liberal conservative'. Ilyin viewed early fascism as a 'concentration of state-guarding forces from the right, which was a necessary response to the threat of Bolshevism and 'leftist totalitarianism'. This kind of dictatorship, he argued, was needed to guard against enemies, because 'in the hour of national danger healthy forces will always concentrate in the direction of a preservative dictatorship'. Ilyin's admiration for early fascism, his arguments for a strong state, organically connected to the people, and his assertion that 'at the head of the state there must be a single will' have inevitably produced comparisons with his German counterpart Carl Schmitt.

== Influence ==
The Ilyins had no children and in 1954 Ilyin expressed the hope that his books would be saved from destruction. Having been taught a severe personal lesson by having his Hegel dissertation manuscript, notes, and materials confiscated in Austria at the outbreak of the First World War (July Crisis), which then had to be rewritten or reconstructed, all the evidence suggests that Ilyin took care to retain and preserve his papers and his books for posterity. Following the death of Ilyin's wife in 1963, Ilyin scholar Nikolai Poltoratzky had Ilyin's manuscripts and papers brought from Zurich to Michigan State University, where he was a professor of the Russian language.

- The Archive would not be sold to nor bestowed upon Michigan State University, but would be provided to the University for temporary use;
- After the fall of the Communist regime in Russia, the Archive should be transferred to Moscow University.

In the USSR, Ilyin was hardly mentioned openly, but his works began to be published in 1988 during glasnost. Sometimes his name is surprisingly absent from descriptions of events in which Ilyin was an active participant, or his role is not considered in enough detail.

In Russia's political culture today, Ilyin enjoys popularity among nationalists and authoritarians who admire his emphatic patriotism and his calls for strong state power in Russia. Ilyin's views influenced Aleksandr Solzhenitsyn and Aleksandr Dugin, before and after the dissolution of the Soviet Union. The accuracy of Ilyin's historical forecasts made some Russian scholars think that it would be necessary to research the methodological basis of Ilyin's analysis. As of 2005, 23 volumes of Ilyin's collected works have been published in Russia.

The Russian filmmaker Nikita Mikhalkov, in particular, was instrumental in propagating Ilyin's ideas in post-Soviet Russia. He authored several articles about Ilyin and came up with the idea of transferring his remains from Switzerland to the Donskoy Monastery in Moscow, where the philosopher had hoped to find his resting place. The ceremony of reburial, also of Anton Denikin, a general whose slogan was Russia, One and Indivisible, was held on 3 October 2005. The Russian Cultural Foundation, founded by Raisa Gorbacheva and affiliated with the Russian Ministry of Culture, formally requested that the papers be returned to Russia. In May 2006, and with the financial help of Viktor Vekselberg the MSU transferred Ilyin's papers and books to the Science Library of the Lomonosov Moscow State University. In 2007 the CIA published a treatise on him. In April 2008, Ilyin's memorial plaque was installed on the oldest building of the Moscow State University at Mokhovaya Street. In June 2012, his monument - cast from meteorite iron - was unveiled in Yekaterinburg.

Ilyin has been quoted by Russian president Vladimir Putin in his speeches on various occasions, and is considered by some observers to be a major ideological inspiration for Putin. Putin decreed moving Ilyin's remains back to Russia, and in 2009 consecrated his grave. At Russian New Year 2014, all high-ranking bureaucrats and local government officials were sent a copy of "Our Tasks", a posthumous collection of Ilyin's 1948-54 articles. He was quoted or mentioned by Dmitry Medvedev, Sergey Lavrov, Patriarch Kirill of Moscow, Vladislav Surkov, and Vladimir Ustinov. On 30 September 2022, Putin gave a speech on the Russian annexation of four territories in Ukraine, where he quoted Ilyin.

== Major works ==
- Hegel's philosophy as a doctrine of the concreteness of God and man (Философия Гегеля как учение о конкретности Бога и человека, 2 vols., 1918; German: Die Philosophie Hegels als kontemplative Gotteslehre, 1946)
- Resistance to Evil By Force (О сопротивлениии злу силою, 1925)
- The Way of Spiritual Revival (1935)
- Foundations of Struggle for the National Russia (1938)
- The Basis of Christian Culture (Основы христианской культуры, 1938)
- About the Future Russia (1948)
- Axioms of Religious Experience (Аксиомы религиозного опыта, 2 volumes, 1953)
- On the Essence of Conscience of Law (О сущности правосознания, 1956)
- The Way to Insight (Путь к очевидности, 1957)
- The Singing Heart. The Book of Silent Contemplation 1958
- On Monarchy and Republic (О монархии и республики, 1978)
- Our Tasks (1948-1954). First published in Paris in 1956. In 1991, another edition of "Our Tasks" was published in Jordanville (USA), carried out by N.P. Poltoratsky.

== Portrayal ==
- Ilyin, played by Kirill Pirogov, appears in a key episode of the TV series Trotsky.

== See also ==
- Orthodoxy, Autocracy, and Nationality
- Russian philosophy
- Alexandre Kojève
- Christian fascism
- Ruscism
- Putinism
