= Cynicism (contemporary) =

Attitude characterised by distrust

Cynicism is an attitude characterized by a general distrust of the motives of others and a lack of faith in other human beings, in the belief that humans are selfish by nature. A cynic may have a general lack of faith or hope in humanity in general or in people motivated by ambition, desire, greed, gratification, materialism, change, goals, and opinions that a cynic perceives as vain, unobtainable, or ultimately meaningless. The term originally derives from the ancient Greek philosophers, the Cynics, who rejected conventional goals of wealth, power, fame, and honor. They practiced shameless nonconformity with social norms in religion, morality, law, manners, housing, dress, or decency, instead advocating the pursuit of virtue in accordance with a simple and natural way of life.

By the 19th century, emphasis on the ascetic ideals and the critique of current civilization based on how it might fall short of an ideal civilization or negativistic aspects of Cynic philosophy led the modern understanding of cynicism to mean a disposition of disbelief in the sincerity or goodness of human motives and actions. Modern cynicism is a distrust toward professed ethical and social values, especially when there are high expectations concerning society, institutions, and authorities that are unfulfilled. It can manifest itself as a result of frustration, disillusionment, and distrust perceived as owing to organizations, authorities, and other aspects of society.

Cynicism is often confused with pessimism or nihilism, perhaps due to their shared association with a lack of faith in humanity. The differences among the three is that cynicism is a distrust by prudence; while due to a sense of defeatism, pessimism is the distrust of potential success. Nihilism on its part is the general distrust cast upon the belief that anything in life (including life itself) has any valuable meaning.

== Overview ==
Modern cynicism has been defined as an attitude of distrust toward claimed ethical and social values and a rejection of the need to be socially involved. It is pessimistic about the capacity of human beings to make correct ethical choices; in this aspect, naiveté is an antonym. Modern cynicism is sometimes regarded as a product of mass society, especially in those circumstances where the individual believes there is a conflict between society's stated motives and goals and actual motives and goals.

== Critical evaluation ==
Cynicism can appear more active in depression. In Critique of Cynical Reason (1983), Peter Sloterdijk defined modern cynics as "borderline melancholics, who can keep their symptoms of depression under control and yet retain the ability to work, whatever might happen ... indeed, this is the essential point in modern cynicism: the ability of its bearers to work—in spite of anything that might happen."

One active aspect of cynicism involves the desire to expose hypocrisy and to point out gaps between ideals and practices. George Bernard Shaw allegedly expressed this succinctly: "The power of accurate observation is commonly called cynicism by those who don't have it".

== Health effects ==
A study published in Neurology journal in 2014 found an association between high levels of late-life "cynical distrust" (interpreted and measured in the study in terms of hostility) and dementia. The survey included 622 people who were tested for dementia for a period of eight years. In that period, 46 people were diagnosed with dementia. "Once researchers adjusted for other factors that could affect dementia risk, such as high blood pressure, high cholesterol and smoking, people with high levels of cynical distrust were three times more likely to develop dementia than people with low levels of cynicism. Of the 164 people with high levels of cynicism, 14 people developed dementia, compared to nine of the 212 people with low levels of cynicism."

Research has also shown that cynicism is related to feelings of disrespect. According to a study published in the Journal of Experimental Psychology: General in 2020, "everyday experiences of disrespect elevated cynical beliefs and vice versa. Moreover, cynical individuals tended to treat others with disrespect, which in turn predicted more disrespectful treatment by others."

== In politics ==
In a 1996 paper, J. N. Cappella and K. H. Jamieson claimed that "healthy skepticism may have given way to corrosive cynicism". Cynicism regarding government or politics can logically lead to political withdrawal and effective political helplessness. In 2013 conservative politician and political theorist William J. Bennett warned that the United States could "crumble from within; that we would become cynical and withdraw".

=== Possible effects ===
A 2004 experiment and paper called The Effects of Strategic News on Political Cynicism, Issue Evaluations, and Policy Support: A Two-Wave Experiment found that the way the news media presents the news can cause political cynicism. The experiment also demonstrated "a negative relation between efficacy and cynicism suggesting that efficacious citizens were less likely to be cynical about politics". It was found that straight dry, "issues-based" news did not cause political cynicism, but that "Strategic News" and "game news" did. The latter two types of news presentation emphasize:

...the horse race, strategy, and tactics of politics,"..."news coverage of candidate motivations and personalities, focus on disagreement between parties, candidates or voters, and the presence and emphasis on polls in the news," or "positioning the electorate as spectators and candidates as performers."

== Social cynicism ==
Social cynicism results from high expectations concerning society, institutions and authorities; unfulfilled expectations lead to disillusionment, which releases feelings of disappointment and betrayal.

In organizations, cynicism manifests itself as a general or specific attitude, characterized by frustration, hopelessness, disillusionment and distrust in regard to economic or governmental organizations, managers or other aspects of work. Members' sense of self (e.g., authenticity) can contribute to how cynical they feel toward the organization.

=== Psychology ===
Naïve cynicism is a philosophy of mind, cognitive bias and form of psychological egoism that occurs when people naïvely expect more egocentric bias in others than actually is the case.

The term was formally proposed by Justin Kruger and Thomas Gilovich and has been studied across a wide range of contexts including: negotiations, group-membership, marriage, economics, government policy and more.

== Legal cynicism ==
Legal cynicism is a domain of legal socialization defined by a perception that the legal system and law enforcement agents are "illegitimate, unresponsive, and ill equipped to ensure public safety." It is related to police legitimacy, and the two serve as important ways for researchers to study citizens' perceptions of law enforcement.

== See also ==
- Doubt
- Doomer
- Fanaticism
- Human nature
- Melancholia
- Misanthropy
- Moral realism
- Nihilism
- "No good deed goes unpunished"
- Pessimism
- Pragmatism
- Resentment
- Rational choice theory
- Skepticism
- Weltschmerz
