= Social Development and Research Foundation =

Indian non-governmental organization

The Social Development and Research Foundation (SDRF) is an autonomous non-governmental organization (NGO) based at Greater Noida Greater Noida, in the National Capital Region (NCR)Delhi NCR of India. This organization was established and registered under Indian Trust Act 1882, with a mission to create conducive environment for education, relief to the poor, better health and hygiene facilities, and advancement of all kinds of charitable objectives of general public utility. The SDRF works pro-actively to bring out positive change in the lives of people who are genuinely deprived of opportunities in life.

The SDRF promotes and undertakes research studies, development studies, educational activities, health awareness campaign, and all other social and cultural activities which are relevant to the contemporary societal needs in order to strengthen the very social fabric of the nation. This Foundation vows to render assistance for any public charitable purpose and national cause, and to take up, initiate and assist social development activities or welfare programmes of all possible kinds and in all possible areas for bringing positive change in the lives of the common people.

The headquarters of Social Development and Research Foundation is in Greater Noida (Delhi-NCR), India, and it operates across states on all India basis.

Social Development and Research Foundation
Founder: Dr. Gopal Krishna Thakur
Type: NGO
Registration No.: 1516/2011
Founded: 2011
Headquarters: Greater Noida, India
Area Served: All over India
Website: http://sdrf.webs.com/

Some of the prominent educationists, technocrats, and social activists, were behind the conceptualization of this organization and they continue to strive as a 'think tank' for the SDRF for its strategic decisions.

The major issues that the SDRF endeavours to address are - Literacy Literacy in India and education, ICT based education and training, Intervention in mainstream school system, Teacher training, Innovative methods of teaching, Right to education Right to education, Sports promotion, Environment & forests, Drinking water, Agricultural innovations, Renewable sources of energy Renewable energy, Poverty alleviation by making people vocationally skilled, Developing self-support system, Women empowerment, Health awareness & family welfare, Social medicine Social medicine, Aged/elderly care, Child rights Child rights issues, Civic issues, Welfare for the disabled Disabled, Disaster management, Human rights Human rights, Information & communication technology Information and communications technology, Legal Awareness, Minority issues, Panchayati raj, Right to information Right to Information & advocacy, Rural development & poverty Alleviation, Scientific & industrial research, Science & Technology, Tribal affairs Tribal, Urban Development, Promotion of Art Art & Culture Culture, Intervention to bring out positive change in the lives of marginalized and less fortunate section of society, etc.
