= Legal consciousness =

Legal consciousness is legal awareness of ideas, views, feelings and traditions imbibed through legal socialization; which reflects as legal culture among given individual, or a group, or a given society at large. The legal consciousness evaluates the existing law and also bears in mind an image of the desired or ideal law.

Consciousness is not an individual trait nor solely ideational; legal consciousness is a type of social practice reflecting and forming social structures. The study of legal consciousness documents the forms of participation and interpretation through which act or sustain, reproduce, or amend the circulating contested or hegemonic structures of meanings concerning law. Legal consciousness is the way in which law is experienced and interpreted by specific individuals as they engage, avoid, resist or just assume the law and legal meanings.

Legal consciousness is a state of being, legal socialisation is the process to Legal consciousness; where as legal awareness & legal mobilisation are means to achieve the same.

== Definition ==
Legal consciousness is defined by Ewick and Silbey as the process by which people make sense of their experiences by relying on legal categories and concepts. People do this even when they are not familiar with the details and minutia of law or the legal system. They explain that there are cultural schemas provided by law that people use to make sense of their experiences. They refer to this as legality. The concept of legality includes "the meanings, sources, authority and cultural practices that are commonly recognized as legal, regardless of who employs them or for what ends." These meanings and sources and different ways of knowing and understanding enable people to make sense of what happens to them and what that might mean in terms of their rights and options. This process of understanding legal experiences occurs within a larger ecosystem in which there are disputes over meaning and values. Seron and Munger explain that ""in addition, class may affect legal consciousness: Law may mean different things depending on an individual's location in the various hierarchies of status, prestige, and knowledge associated with membership in a social class.

== Legal consciousness narratives ==
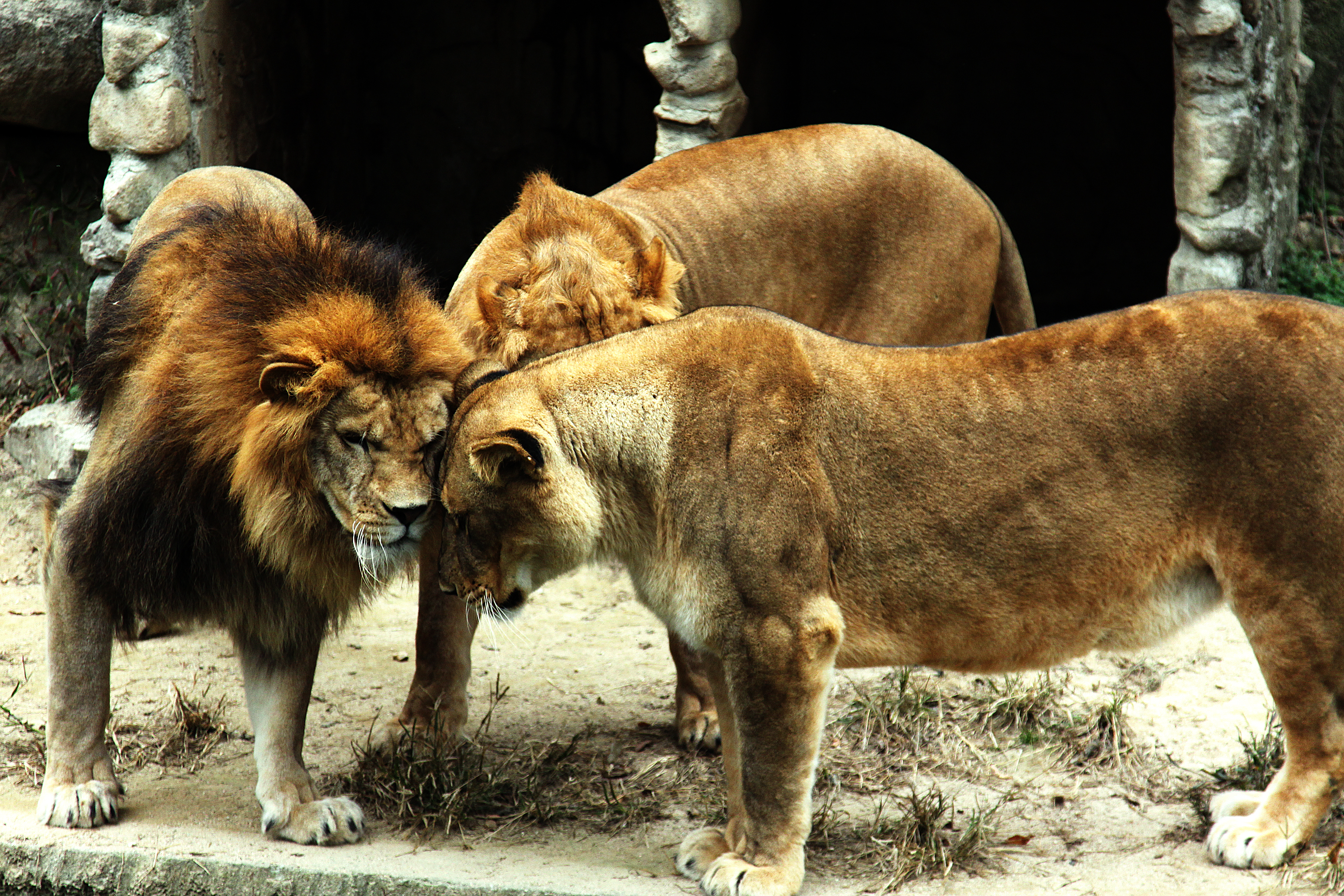

legal consciousness narratives

- Before the law
- With the law
- Against the law

== See also ==
- Law
- Consciousness
- Natural law
- Legal positivism
- Legal awareness
- legal mobilisation
- legal socialisation
- Legal psychology
