= Index of civics articles =

Civics is usually considered a branch of applied ethics. Within any given political tradition or ethical tradition, civics refers to education in the obligations and the rights of the citizens under that tradition. Topics in civics include:–

== A ==
Abortion, legal and moral issues – Adoption – Adultery – Arbitration – Animal testing

== C ==
Crime – Civic education – Capital punishment – Constitution

== D ==
Defamation – Divorce – Dental

== E ==
Economics

== G ==
Good faith – Grandparent visitation

== H ==
Hate speech

== I ==
Illegitimacy – Immigration – Individual rights – Informed consent

== M ==
Mediation – Mischief – Mistake – Moral rights

== N ==
Natural law

== O ==
Obscenity

== P ==
Paternity – Personal property – Politics-- Product liability – Property – Public education-- Public domain – Public property

== R ==
Rights – Rape – Religion

== S ==
Sanctions (law) – Sexual harassment – Slander – Social control

== See also ==
- List of legal topics
