= Civics =

Study of the rights and obligations of citizenry and government

In the field of political science, civics is the study of the civil and political rights and obligations of citizens in a society. The term civics derives from the Latin word civicus, meaning "relating to a citizen". In U.S. politics, in the context of urban planning, the term civics comprehends the city politics that affect the political decisions of the citizenry of a city.

Civic education is the study of the theoretical, political, and practical aspects of citizenship manifest as political rights, civil rights, and legal obligations. Civic education includes the study of civil law, the civil codes, and government with special attention to the political role of the citizens in the operation and oversight of government.

Moreover, in the context of ancient Roman history, the term civics also refers to the Civic Crown (Latin: corona civica), a garland of oak leaves awarded to Romans who saved the lives of fellow citizens.

== Philosophical views ==
=== Ancient Sparta ===
==== Archidamus ====
In the History of the Peloponnesian War, Thucydides quotes a speech by Archidamus II wherein he stressed the importance for Sparta of civic education for the Spartan virtues of toughness, obedience, cunning, simplicity, and preparedness:

And we are wise, because we are educated with too little learning to despise the laws, and with too severe a self-control to disobey them, and are brought up not to be too knowing in useless matters—such as the knowledge which can give a specious criticism of an enemy's plans in theory, but fails to assail them with equal success in practice—but are taught to consider that the schemes of our enemies are not dissimilar to our own, and that the freaks of chance are not determinable by calculation. In practice we always base our preparations against an enemy on the assumption that his plans are good; indeed, it is right to rest our hopes not on a belief in his blunders, but on the soundness of our provisions. Nor ought we to believe that there is much difference between man and man, but to think that the superiority lies with him who is reared in the severest school.

French essayist Michel de Montaigne commended how Agesilaus II, the son of Archidamus, followed his father's approach closely:

One asking to this purpose, Agesilaus, what he thought most proper for boys to learn? "What they ought to do when they come to be men," said he.

==== Simonides ====
Plutarch relates a comparison made by Simonides between Spartan education of citizens and horse training:

Simonides called Sparta "the tamer of men," because by early strictness of education, they, more than any nation, trained the citizens to obedience to the laws, and made them tractable and patient of subjection, as horses that are broken in while colts.

==== Lycurgus ====
According to the Roman historian Plutarch, the semi-legendary Lycurgus of Sparta considered education of the citizenry to be his main priority as framer of the Spartan constitution. Plutarch observes that 'the whole course of [Spartan] education was one of continued exercise of a ready and perfect obedience' in which 'there scarcely was any time or place without someone present to put them in mind of their duty, and punish them if they had neglected it.'

He also describes how the Spartans limited civic education so as to maintain social control over the young:

Reading and writing they gave them, just enough to serve their turn; their chief care was to make them good subjects, and to teach them to endure pain and conquer in battle.

However, the youth were also required to express themselves forcefully and succinctly, as well to think and reflect on matters of civic virtue, including such questions as who is or is not a good citizen of Sparta. Montaigne would later praise this particular technique of education, admiring the way Spartan citizens spent their time learning to acquire virtues such as courage and temperance, to the exclusion of studying any other subject. Spartan boys were also taught music and songs in praise of courage and in condemnation of cowardice.

Essentially, the Spartan ideal of civic education was a process whereby the interest of the citizen becomes totally united with the interest of the polity, in a spirit of perfect patriotism: 'To conclude, Lycurgus bred up his citizens in such a way that they neither would nor could live by themselves; they were to make themselves one with the public good, and, clustering like bees around their commander, be by their zeal and public spirit carried all but out of themselves, and devoted wholly to their country.

Civic education for toughness and martial prowess was not only within the purview of Spartan men: Plutarch recounts how Lycurgus 'ordered the maidens to exercises themselves with wrestling, running, throwing the quoit, and chasing the dart' with a view to creating healthy children for the state.

=== Ancient Athens ===
==== Pericles ====
Pericles' Funeral Oration provides insight into Athens' sharply contrasting form of civic education from Sparta, for personal freedom, rather than blind obedience, where he boasts that Athens is 'the school of Hellas', since:

in education, where our rivals from their very cradles by a painful discipline seek after manliness, at Athens we live exactly as we please, and yet are just as ready to encounter every legitimate danger.

However, English philosopher Thomas Hobbes believed that the Athenians were only taught to think they had personal freedom in order to discourage them from seeking reform.

==== Crito ====
In the Socratic dialogue Crito, Crito of Alopece learns from Socrates the importance in civic education of following expert opinion, rather than majority opinion. Socrates uses the analogy of the training gymnast, who he implies ought to follow his gymnastics trainer, not whatever the majority of people think about gymnastics. Crito also hears Socrates' argument that a citizen ought to obey his city's laws partly because it was his city which educated him for citizenship.

==== Aeschyslus ====
In the Aristophanes comedy The Frogs, the character of the playwright Aeschylus scolds fellow tragedian Euripides for writing scenes pernicious to proper ideals of citizenship:

What crimes is he not guilty of?
Did he not put up on display
pimps and women giving birth
in holy shrines and having sex
with their own brothers, and then claim
that living is no life? So now,
because of him our city here
is crammed with bureaucratic types
and stupid democratic apes
who always cheat our people.
Nobody carries on the torch—
no one's trained in that these days.

During his diatribe, he emphasises the importance of poetry to civic education:

Small children have a teacher helping them,
for young men there's the poets—we've got
a solemn duty to say useful things.

Similarly, Plutarch would later speak of the power of the poet Thales to, in the words of the English poet John Milton, 'prepare and mollify the Spartan surliness with his smooth songs and odes, the better to plant among them law and civility'. Plutarch also spoke of the deep influence of Homer's 'lessons of state' on Lycurgus, framer of the Spartan constitution.

==== Adrastus ====
In the Euripides tragedy The Suppliants, King Adrastus of Argos describes how Hippomedon received his civic education for endurance, martial skill, and service to the state:

Such another was Hippomedon, third of all this band; from his very boyhood he refrained from turning towards the allurements of the Muses, to lead life of ease; his home was in the fields, and gladly would he school his nature to hardships with a view to manliness, aye hasting to the chase, rejoicing in his steeds or straining of his bow, because he would make himself of use unto his state.

Adrastus also describes how Parthenopeus received his education for citizenship in his adopted city:

Next behold the huntress Atalanta's son, Parthenopaeus, a youth of peerless beauty; from Arcady he came even to the streams of Inachus, and in Argos spent his boyhood. There, when he grew to man's estate, first, as is the duty of strangers settled in another land, he showed no pique or jealousy against the state, became no quibbler, chiefest source of annoyance citizen or stranger can give, but took his stand amid the host, and fought for Argos as he were her own son, glad at heart whenso the city prospered, deeply grieved if e'er reverses came; many a lover though he had midst men and maids, yet was he careful to avoid offence.

=== Ancient Rome ===
==== Aurelius ====
In his Meditations, Marcus Aurelius tells of how he was educated as a citizen to value free speech, to refrain from rhetoric and giving hortatory lectures, and to perceive the defects of tyranny. From his brother he imbibed a specific ideal for the Roman state:

He it was also that did put me in the first conceit and desire of an equal commonwealth, administered by justice and equality; and of a kingdom wherein should be regarded nothing more than the good and welfare of the subjects.

He also followed the example of his adopted father Antoninus Pius, who he said kept careful watch of government administration and finances, was open to hearing ideas about how to serve the common good, and cared neither for ambition nor pandering to the popular will:

Again, that secrets he neither had many, nor often, and such only as concerned public matters: his discretion and moderation, in exhibiting of the public sights and shows for the pleasure and pastime of the people: in public buildings. [sic] congiaries, and the like. In all these things, having a respect unto men only as men, and to the equity of the things themselves, and not unto the glory that might follow.

Aurelius was also taught by his father how to live as a public figure restrained by modesty:

That I lived under the government of my lord and father, who would take away from me all pride and vainglory, and reduce me to that conceit and opinion that it was not impossible for a prince to live in the court without a troop of guards and followers, extraordinary apparel, such and such torches and statues, and other like particulars of state and magnificence; but that a man may reduce and contract himself almost to the state of a private man, and yet for all that not to become the more base and remiss in those public matters and affairs, wherein power and authority is requisite.

=== Early Modern England ===
==== Hobbes ====
In his treatise Leviathan, English philosopher Thomas Hobbes heavily criticised the emphasis in contemporary civic education on studying Athenian democracy and Roman republicanism, saying that it wrongly encouraged monarchical subjects to restrain the actions of their monarchs. He thought that those citizens who imbibed the value of democracy from classic works were likely to oppose monarchy in the manner rabid dogs avoid water. Hobbes was deeply uncomfortable with Aristotelian civic education, which he said advised popular governance instead of monarchical rule.

==== Bacon ====
English philosopher Francis Bacon was aware of the relevance of civic education to what he termed 'civil merit'. However, in his essay The Advancement of Learning, Bacon also argues that civic education should be preceded by religious and moral education, so that those who judge policy will not be under the influence of moral relativism.

== Civic education ==
The "strongest, political rationale" for democratic schools is that they teach "the virtues of democratic deliberation for the sake of future citizenship." This type of education is often alluded to in the deliberative democracy literature as fulfilling the necessary and fundamental social and institutional changes necessary to develop a democracy that involves intensive participation in group decision making, negotiation, and social life of consequence. Civic education can teach democratic theory, such as median mandate. Sudbury schools contend that values, social justice and democracy must be learned through experience as Aristotle said: "For the things we have to learn before we can do them, we learn by doing them." They adduce that for this purpose schools must encourage ethical behavior and personal responsibility. In order to achieve these goals schools must allow students the three great freedoms—freedom of choice, freedom of action and freedom to bear the results of action—that constitute personal responsibility.

== See also ==
- Civic education in the United States
- Acculturation
- Civic engagement
- Community
- Digital civics
- Etiquette
- Global civics
- Global citizenship education
- History of citizenship
- Index of civics articles
- Law and order
- Legal awareness
- Legal socialisation
- Participation (decision making)
- Political Science
- Public space
- Socialisation
- Spatial Citizenship
- Voting
- Civic education in Tanzania
