= Legal cynicism =

Negative perception of law enforcement

Legal cynicism is a domain of legal socialization defined by a perception that the legal system and law enforcement agents are "illegitimate, unresponsive, and ill equipped to ensure public safety." It is related to police legitimacy, and the two serve as important ways for researchers to study citizens' perceptions of law enforcement.

== Definitions ==
Sampson and Bartusch (1998) defined legal cynicism as "'anomie' about law". Based on Sampson & Bartusch's work, and on that of Leo Srole, Piquero et al. (2005) defined it based on respondents' answers to a five-question survey. In the survey, respondents were asked to rank, on a four-point scale, the extent to which they agreed with each of these statements:

1. Laws are meant to be broken,
2. It is okay to do anything you want,
3. There are no right or wrong ways to make money,
4. If I have a fight with someone, it is no one else's business, and
5. A person has to live without thinking about the future.

== Causes and correlates ==
Legal cynicism can be exacerbated when police engage in aggressive misconduct in a community, which can lead to greater violence and less cooperation between the community's citizens and the police. It has been found to be higher in neighborhoods with higher levels of concentrated disadvantage, even after controlling for demographic factors and crime rates. The strongest predictor of legal cynicism is self-reported delinquency.

== Effects ==
Legal cynicism and legitimacy both have significant effects on criminal offending, even after accounting for self-control. Legal cynicism is also associated with lower rates of desistance from intimate partner violence, higher homicide rates, and higher recidivism rates among released prisoners. It has also been found to affect parents' assessments of their adolescent children's violent behavior.

== See also ==
- Penal populism
- Police perjury
- The talk (racism in the United States)
