= Legal awareness =

Empowerment of individuals regarding issues involving the law

Legal awareness, sometimes called public legal education or legal literacy, is the empowerment of individuals regarding issues involving the law. Legal awareness helps to promote consciousness of legal culture, participation in the formation of laws and the rule of law.

Public legal education, sometimes called civics education, comprises a range of activities intended to build public awareness and skills related to law and the justice system. This term also refers to the fields of practice and study concerned with those activities, and to a social and professional movement that advocates greater societal commitment to educating people about the law. Anna-Marie Marshall explains that "in order to realize their rights, people need to take the initiative to articulate them. This initiative, in turn, depends on the availability and the relevance of legal schema to people confronting problems." This is because laws exist as part of a larger organizational ecosystem in which the interests of the organization as well as those of the actors become inextricably linked to the ways in which they are enacted.

Distinct from the education of students in law school seeking a degree in law (which is often simply called "legal education") and the continuing professional education of lawyers and judges (which is sometimes called "continuing legal education"), public legal education is principally aimed at people who are not lawyers, judges, or degree-seeking law students.

The term "public legal education" (PLE) is related to, and may encompass, several similar terms. The terms "public legal information" and "public legal education and information" (PLEI) emphasize a difference between educating and providing information. The term "community legal education" is common in Australia and the United States, where it often refers to community-based public legal education activities led by legal aid organizations. The term "law-related education" (LRE) usually refers to public legal education in primary and secondary schools (and sometimes in higher education), as opposed to PLE for adults and outside of school.

== Definition of Legal awareness ==
According to the American Bar Association, Commission on Public Understanding, legal awareness is "the ability to make critical judgments about the substance of the law, the legal process, and available legal resources and to effectively utilize the legal system and articulate strategies to improve it is legal literacy".

The Canadian Bar Association (1992, 23) defines legal literacy as "the ability to understand words used in a legal context, to draw conclusions from them, and then to use those conclusions to take action."

With little change to the Multiple Action Research Group's (MARG, an NGO working for the promotion of legal awareness) definition, legal awareness can be defined as "critical knowledge of legal provisions and processes, coupled with the skills to use this knowledge to respect and realize rights and entitlements".

== Thought, philosophy, and different approaches to legal literacy ==
The "continuum approach" considers legal literacy as "a capacity spread along a continuum, with lawyers and judges at one end and relatively incapable laypersons at the other". This approach was adopted by the legal scholar White who considered legal literacy to mean "that degree of competence in legal discourse required for meaningful and active life in our increasingly legalistic and litigious culture".

Author Bilder (1999) defines legal literacy as a "spectrum of functional skills", related to the conduct of litigation. The continuum approach explains, "a certain degree of legal literacy is required for effective participation in modern society, but it is not necessary for the average citizen to reach the professional standard of 'thinking (and writing) like a lawyer.'"

One of the recent approaches considers legal literacy as a metaphor. According to this view, the term is "intended to suggest some parallels between the institution of the law, and a system of language to be mastered, knowledge gained and understanding achieved". These authors suggest that the term legal literacy can also function as a model for educators who seek to promote such literacy. Proponents of legal literacy may thus look to the teaching of language for guidance.

== Need and importance ==
Anoop Kumar, a researcher of Legal Literacy Mission, says in his study, "the legislature of the state and the parliament, while enacting the legislation, consider the objectives of it. Some laws lay down the substantive rights of the masses and some touch upon the procedural aspect of certain laws. But it is due to lack of awareness of beneficiaries that most of the legislations are ineffective at the stage of their execution."

Without (legal) literacy people can get intimidated and alienated from law. This may evolve into a situation which results in people coming into conflict with the law, or being unable to obtain help from it. Courts have acknowledged the barrier raised by a lack of literacy to asserting guaranteed rights effectively. Low literacy may block people's access to justice. At times, literacy requirements have been used to block access to rights and benefits.

=== Goals and objectives ===
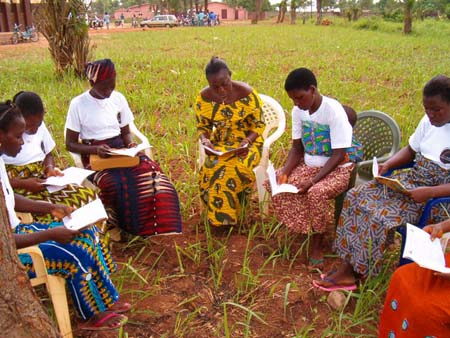
Women read about their legal rights in a public awareness campaign (Benin)

Goals of the legal literacy programs can be broadly divided in three types. Namely educational, competency and critical.

In Reading the Legal World, author Laird Hunter expects legal literacy to achieve: "People using the legal system must be able to guide themselves through a process that they understand ... and, at appropriate places along the way."

- recognize they have a legal right or responsibility, in order to exercise or assume it;
- recognize when a problem or conflict is a legal conflict and when a legal solution is available;
- know how to take the necessary action to avoid problems and where this is not possible, how to help themselves appropriately;
- know how and where to find information on the law, and be able to find information that is accessible to them,
- know when and how to obtain suitable legal assistance;
- have confidence that the legal system will provide a remedy, and
- understand the process clearly enough to perceive that justice has been done

Depending on the goals there can be a number of objectives for legal literacy programs.

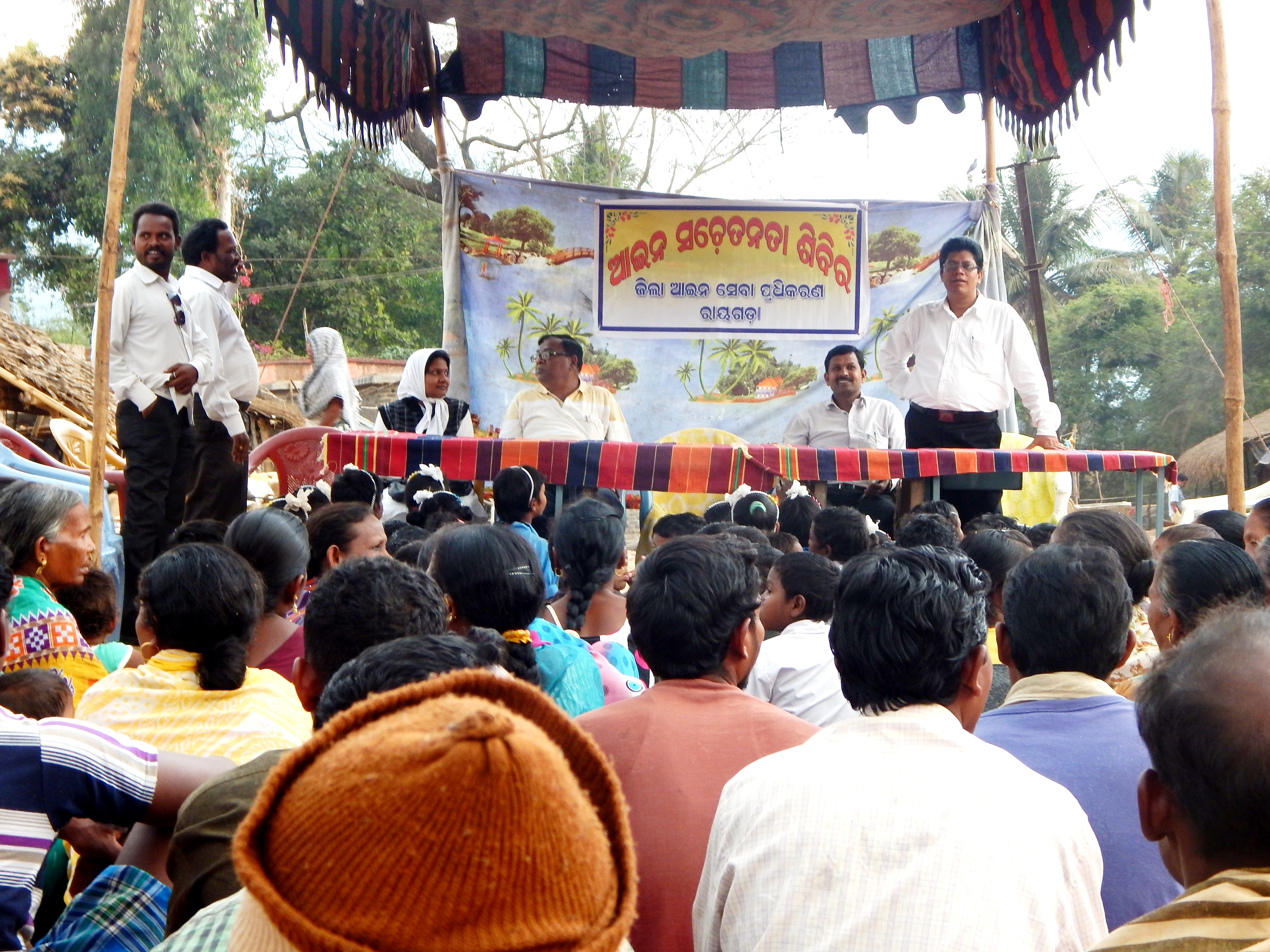
Legal Awareness Camp by DLSA, Rayagada(India)

- List of possible objectives:
  - raising awareness and building capacity
  - training of trainers
  - community education and legal empowerment
  - exposing law students to social justice work
  - strengthening community solidarity and supporting grass-roots advocacy

=== Methods adopted to promote legal awareness ===
There have been many cases where governments have promoted long-term legal literacy missions or awareness campaigns. An example of this is when institutions arrange legal literacy events.

Legal awareness is also achieved through camps, lectures, and interactive workshops or crash programs on the essential and elementary legal laws. Among the general public, many wish to spend time listening to scholars on contemporary issues that have significant bearing on the rights and livelihood of ordinary people. Other methods are road shows, radio talks, street and theatre plays, as well as the publication of relevant books, periodicals, posters, and charts that deal with particular laws, the distribution of pamphlets, brochures, and stickers, the display of paintings, illustrations in comics, and other ways to ensure publicity for various legal mobilisation activities.

Strategically located display boards in public places (railway stations, bus stations, market places, in front of major government offices and police stations) are also used to help government officials, police, and the public to understand the spirit of law.

== Obstacles ==
According to Lorenzo Cotula, laws are usually published in the official gazette, few people outside legal circles have access to legal information. Illiteracy, economic barriers, language barriers, social taboos and a lack of zeal among the legal fraternity may lead to obstacles in gaining requisite levels of legal literacy. According to Hanna Hasl-Kelchner, at times lack of zeal among lawyers make them prone to saying no and killing a deal rather than working through the issues and finding solutions that are both practical and legally sound.

In a note to the UN General Assembly 67th session, the UN Secretary General states, "the deprivations that persons living in poverty encounter throughout their lives — lack of access to quality education, reduced access to information, limited political voice and social capital — translate into lower levels of legal literacy and awareness of their rights, creating social obstacles to seeking redress".

The absence of a legal culture and the resulting illiteracy are the main reasons for the large number of cases in the courts. If the accused citizen knows that an act is a crime punishable by law, they may not do it.

In the domain of law a vast category of users need to exchange legal information worldwide and carry out activities in a context where a common understanding of law beyond language is highly desirable. However, this requirement is hard to meet, due to the variety of languages and modes in which the legal discourse is expressed as well as to the diversity of legal orders and the legal concepts on which these systems are founded.

About lesser significance to legal literacy in US legal education, Leonard J. Long professor of law, Quinnipiac University School of Law says, "law students, law firms, consumers of legal services, and society as a whole would benefit from having a legal profession comprised and dominated by people who are literate in American law, its history, and its jurisprudence. But legal literacy is not promoted mainly because it is not viewed as necessary for the practice of law. This is part of the anti-intellectual tradition in American law generally, and in American legal education specifically".

== Institutional and corporate legal literacy ==
Corporate, institutions and NGOs are subject to and are supposed to follow various sets of laws.

=== Corporate legal literacy ===
Legal awareness is an important part of professional work life. According to John Akula, when law-sensitive issues arise, corporate executives often find themselves in what is, for them, unmapped territory, often without requisite law training. When corporate executives work with attorneys they need to develop a common language to bridge probable communication gaps to achieve legal astuteness.

According to Hanna Hasl-Kelchner, legal literacy can help to bridge the gap between law and business by simplifying legal terms into language that makes business sense and offers a new way to think about the law as a useful business tool. She says, "corporate legal literacy involves balanced understanding of cross disciplinary influences bringing in legal risk exposure, avoiding lawsuits and transforming potential business legal issues that threaten growth and profitability, into opportunities for building stronger business relationships, delivering sustainable stakeholder value, improving competitive advantage and foremost embedding compliance into the corporate culture to achieve organizational excellence".

According to Hasl-Kelchner, corporate legal literacy tackles companies' legal risk profiles on both the employee and organizational levels. There is a need to identify the infrastructure needed to support legal literacy and promote effective communications throughout the organization.

=== Institutional legal literacy ===
George Pulikuthiyil, executive director of NGO Jananeethi in his essay Legal Literacy for Social Empowerment says that, 'Well educated and highly placed professionals too are often not aware of provisions in laws and implications of their violations. Many would not know the nitty-gritty of several statutory laws and their applications. ... However, the fact remains that vast majority of the officers and professionals like clinical psychologists, therapeutic counsellors, welfare officers, social workers, institutional heads and academia are ignorant of their role and responsibilities as contemplated in the Act. NGOs do take pains to organize workshops to sensitize them with respect to such new generation legislations wherein the pro-active role of various stake holders are great significance.' George Pulikuthiyil further believes non-governmental organizations, community-based organizations, faith groups, various service providers, trade unions, youth clubs, police personnel, elected representatives to local bodies, PG students of social work and service organizations also have larger scope of improving the quality of life provided they are made conversant with respective legislations.

=== Designated legal officers ===
Apart from external legal advisors, internal legal officers and in certain countries like Australia and India, The company secretary is responsible for advising on good governance practices and compliance of corporate governance norms as prescribed under various corporate, securities and other business laws, regulations and guidelines made thereunder.

== Related concepts ==
There are certain related concepts including legal consciousness, legal mobilization and legal socialization, legal empowerment, that helps to put legal literacy in perspective.

=== Civics and socio-legal literacy ===
Despite semantic proximity education of civics, civics literacy and legal literacy are not exactly the same. In the "legal literacy" semantic components are the dominant notion of the "right", "law", "responsibility to the law", and "civic literacy" added to them the concept of "civil society", "individual rights and freedoms" and "man's responsibility to civil society". In the formal civic education system, human rights can be taken up as a part of civic education, values education and social studies, though they may have the limitation of presenting only certain aspects of human rights rather than their integrated whole, and duties of citizens may be overly emphasized to the detriment of certain rights and freedoms.

At the elementary school level, usually minimal level legal literacy introduction is taught through civics, but which is not necessarily adequate for the rest of life. Applied legal education is imparted through business and commerce school and some other branches. News media also plays a part, but is unable to meet all socio-legal literacy needs. NGOs and legal aid centres may provide for limited legal literacy related to specific thrust areas.

== Legal literacy mission ==
China conducts Nationwide Legal Awareness Raising Campaigns (NLARC) this five-year program has been conducted since 1986. National Legal Services Authority (India) conducted a five-year nationwide "National Legal Literacy Mission" from 2005 to 2010.

== Legal literacy events and celebrations ==
Between March 20 to April 5 annual legal awareness celebrations take place in Australia. Australian Employee Legal Awareness Day is held annually on February 13. In India, National Legal Literacy Day is on November 9.

== Internet and legal literacy ==
The Internet as a legal research tool is advantageous for most primary legal research materials, which can be located for free to supplement fee-based services and library collections. The Internet offers increased access to resources, low- or no-cost access, and real-time information via social media.

Author Roger Smith, an expert in domestic and international aspects of legal aid, human rights and access to justice; says in his article "IT changes bring hope – and hype", that Technology offers the opportunity significantly to cut costs and to leverage existing provision. Author Roger Smith further believes there is enough to suggest potential usage of internet and its interactive capacities of internet in information sharing. According to Roger Smith (Internet and) Technology also opens up the possibility of providing ‘just in time’ public legal education which might just be the answer to the yawning gap in family law advice. Roger Smith further says 'technology can be used to construct a network of (online legal) provision which provides the level of legal advice and assistance to which people are entitled - even in times of austerity.'

Founded in 1992 by Peter Martin and Tom Bruce, Legal Information Institute (LII) a non-profit, public service of Cornell Law School that provides no-cost access to current American and international legal research sources online at law.cornell.edu is a pioneer in the delivery of legal information online. LII was the first law site developed on the internet. Public service of Cornell Law School promotes Legal Information Institute which in turn promotes Free Access to Law Movement and work on principles adopted at Montreal declaration (2002 and amended subsequently); which advocates publishing of public legal information via internet.

In India, MARG (Multiple Action Research Group), an organization working for empowerment is using internet and social networking sites to empower netizens. The organization posts every Friday "friday facts" in their Facebook, Twitter & Instagram pages. These posts/pictures focuses on rights of the citizens and all other important information about laws in India.

== Important institutions promoting legal awareness and legal literacy ==
Bar councils, lawyer federations and various NGOs take the lead in promoting legal awareness and legal literacy. In India, as per the Legal Services Authorities Act, 1987, the National Legal Services Authority (NLSA) has been designated to take appropriate measures for spreading legal literacy and legal awareness amongst the people.

In Indiana, in the United States, Outreach for Legal Literacy (OLL) is a community service program in which law students teach law to fifth-graders in local elementary schools.

== Access to justice ==
Legal awareness of the public is directly connected to access to justice issues, as most people do not pursue legal action because of a lack of awareness of the applicable legality.

=== United States ===
Researchers have found that most civil justice problems American experience, worthy of legal process, receive no legal attention whatsoever. Legal professionals give them no consideration and they never reach court. Those who receive representation through hiring lawyers represent a fraction of people who have a legitimate cause. This crisis has been labelled as an "unmet legal need." Every year, 55 million Americans experience 260 million legal problems. Among these legal problems, the 120 million legal problems are mostly not resolved every year. Low-income Americans are most vulnerable among the population, but the access to justice issue is experienced nationally among all different groups of the population. The access to justice problem has been said to have impacted all types of people, perpetuating serious legal, social, economic, and political consequences across American society. Increased access to justice is viewed as the primary advocated solution.

Part of the American crisis in access to justice is the presumption that any legal problem necessitates the involvement of a lawyer. The expansion of greater legal services, accessible to more people, has resulted from this presumption. According to Rebecca L. Sandefur, problems with access to justice can be resolved through a departure from this framing:

Resolving justice problems lawfully does not always require lawyers’ assistance. Evidence shows that only some of the justice problems experienced by the public benefit from lawyers’ services or other legal interventions, while others do not. That is because such intervention is excessive or because it might be the wrong treatment for the problem. This finding holds true whether the outcome of interest is benefits to society or benefits to a person with a problem.

Most civil justice problems are handled by people on their own, or with advice from family and friends. The most common reason people give for not turning to lawyers is not the cost of lawyers’ help. There is a much more important reason: people do not consider law as a solution for their justice problems; they do not think of their problems as being “legal,” even when the legal system could help solve them. They think of them simply as problems: problems in relationships, problems at work, or problems with neighbors. One of the most important reasons that people handle their problems on their own rather than seeking any kind of formal help is that they believe that they already understand their situation and their options for handling it.

== See also ==
- Rule of law
- Legal aid
- Legal advice
- Legal education
- Civics
- Consciousness raising
- Ignorantia juris non excusat
- Popular education
- Free Access to Law Movement
- Outline of law enforcement
- Plain language
