= Vozrojdénie =

Vozrojdénie Возрождение
- Type: Daily
- Editor-in-chief: Julien Semenoff
- Founded: 1925
- Political alignment: Anti-Communist
- Language: Russian language
- Headquarters: 73, Champs-Élysées, Paris 48°52′15.8″N 2°18′12.4″E

Vozrojdénie (Russian: Возрождение, 'Renaissance') was a Russian language daily newspaper published from Paris, France, founded in 1925. The newspaper was anti-Communist, and circulated amongst the Russian diaspora around the world. As of the mid-1930s, its editor-in-chief was Julien Semenoff.
