= Legal mobilisation =

Legal mobilisation is the employment of legal processes and resources by activist groups or individuals in order to achieve specific social and political outcomes. It is a form of social mobilisation that focuses on successfully pleading strategic litigation cases before the courts.

The mobilisation of the law may involve multiple stakeholders, including advocacy groups, marginalised communities, non-governmental organisations, independent government agencies, and lawyers.

== Definition ==
An early definition of legal mobilisation by Frances Kahen Zemans describes the law as being mobilised when "a desire or want is translated into a demand as an assertion of one's rights".

== Process ==
Legislative activity creates an opportunity for legal mobilization. The courts become particularly relevant when petitioners have grounds to file suit.

== See also ==
- Legal awareness
- Legal empowerment
- Public interest law
- Advocacy
- Judicial restraint
- Judicial activism
- Social mobilisation
