= Leo Srole =

American sociologist

- Born: October 8, 1908; Chicago, Illinois, US
- Died: May 1, 1993 (aged 84); Queens, New York, US
- Education: Harvard University (S.B., 1933); University of Chicago (Ph.D., 1940)
- Spouse: Esther Alpiner
- Children: 2
- Scientific career
- Fields: Sociology
- Workplaces: Columbia University; New York State Psychiatric Institute
- Thesis: Ethnic groups and American society: a study in the dynamics of social stratification (1940)
- Doctoral advisor: W. Lloyd Warner

Leo Srole (October 8, 1908 in Chicago, Illinois – May 1, 1993 in Queens, New York) was an American sociologist who taught at Columbia University and the New York State Psychiatric Institute (NYSPI).

== Early life and education ==
Srole was born and raised in Chicago, Illinois, the son of Lithuanian Jewish immigrants. He received his S.B. from Harvard University in 1933, after which he began studying with W. Lloyd Warner at the Peabody Museum of Archaeology and Ethnology. He then began working with Eliot Chapple in Newburyport before transferring to the University of Chicago to complete his Ph.D. under Warner's supervision.

== Career ==
After receiving his Ph.D. from the University of Chicago in 1940, Srole taught at New York University and Hobart and William Smith Colleges from 1941 to 1942. He then worked for the United States Army as a military psychologist from 1943 to 1945. Before joining the faculty of Columbia University and the NYSPI, he taught at the State University of New York Downstate Medical Center from 1951 to 1965. He retired from teaching at Columbia and the NYSPI in 1988.

== Research ==
After graduating from the University of Chicago, Srole continued research in the vein of Warner's. He later conducted the Midtown Manhattan Study, known also as "The Midtown Study," landmark research on the mental health of 1,660 residents of New York City. Published in 1962, the study found that less than 20% of those surveyed were in good mental health, a finding that initially prompted doubts, but which was later accepted by other researchers. The American Journal of Psychiatry, for example, described the study as "a beacon to all future researchers", and its results were later used by a presidential commission to project national estimates.
