= Legal socialization =

Acquisition of attitudes to rule of law

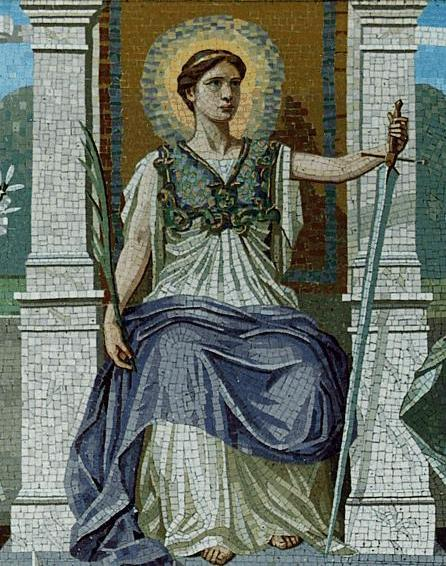
Necessity knows no law but makes law. ~ Gratian

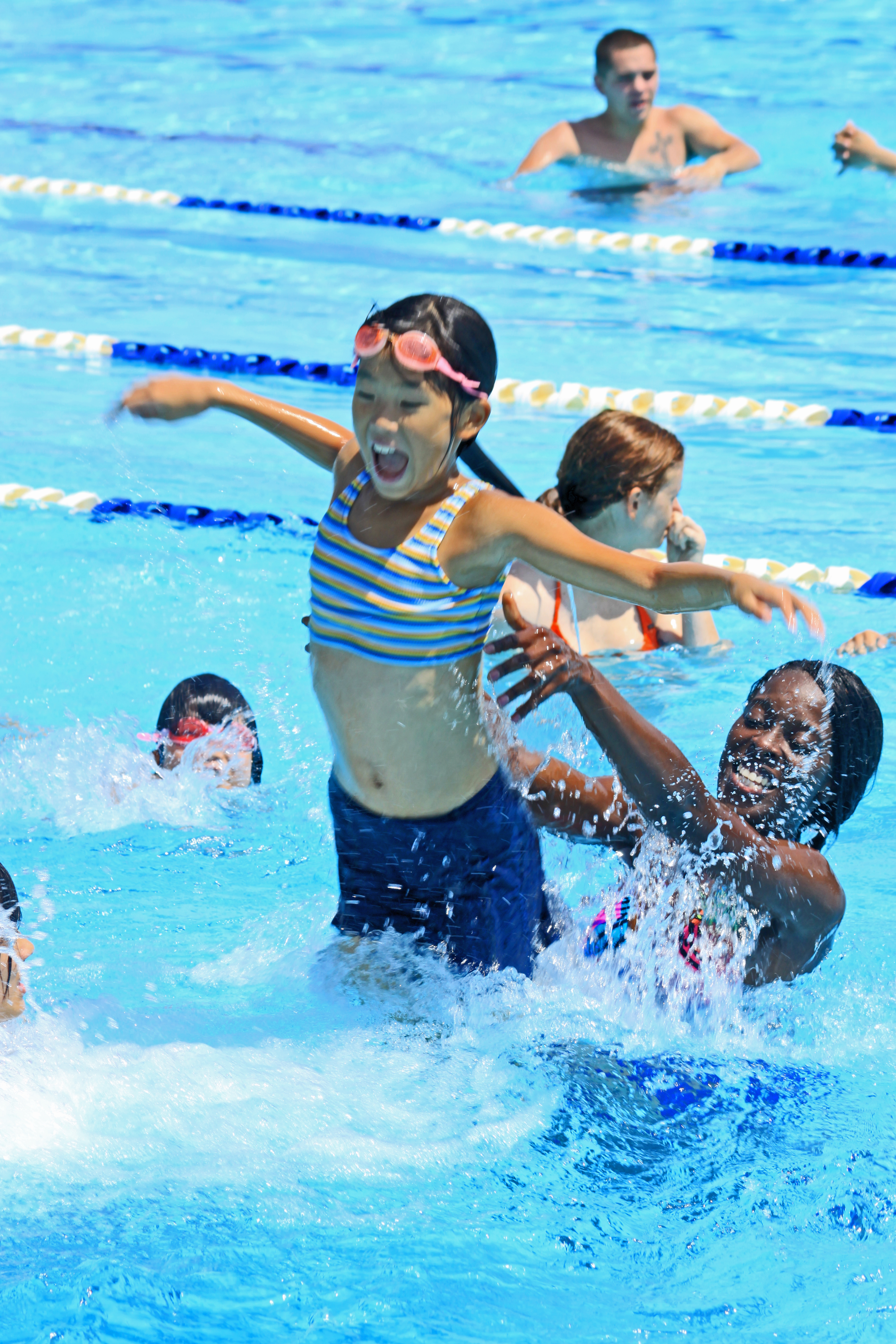
Because just as good morals, if they are to be maintained, have need of the laws, so the laws, if they are to be observed, have need of good morals. ~ Niccolò Machiavelli, Discourses on the First Decade of Titus Livius (1965), trans. Allan Gilbert, book 1, chapter 18, p. 241.

Legal socialization is the process through which, individuals acquire attitudes and beliefs about the law, legal authorities, and legal institutions. This occurs through individuals' interactions, both personal and vicarious, with police, courts, and other legal actors. To date, most of what is known about legal socialization comes from studies of individual differences among adults in their perceived legitimacy of law and legal institutions, and in their cynicism about the law and its underlying norms. Adults' attitudes about the legitimacy of law are directly tied to individuals' compliance with the law and cooperation with legal authorities.

Legal socialization consists of an individual's attitudes toward the legal system (referred to as legitimacy), the law (legal cynicism), and moral codes that guide behavior (moral disengagement)

== Definition ==
Judith Torney includes, recognition of law, understanding function of the law, accurately recognizing source of law, developing relevant attitudes towards those who enforce the law, bringing personal behavior into line with morality and legality.

Psychologist June Louin-Tapp, credited for her "pioneering efforts in legal socialization," defines the concept this way:

Compliance to laws and respect for authority is variously called socialization, internalization of norms, conformity to rules, identification, moral internalization, and conscience formation. Regardless of nomenclature, psychologists have attended to the problem of compliant behavior as an aspect of socialization research, crucial to the maintenance of the social system. Essentially socialization is the process whereby members of a society learn its norms and acquire its values and behavior patterns.

== Legal internalization and jurisprudential reception and process of acculturation ==
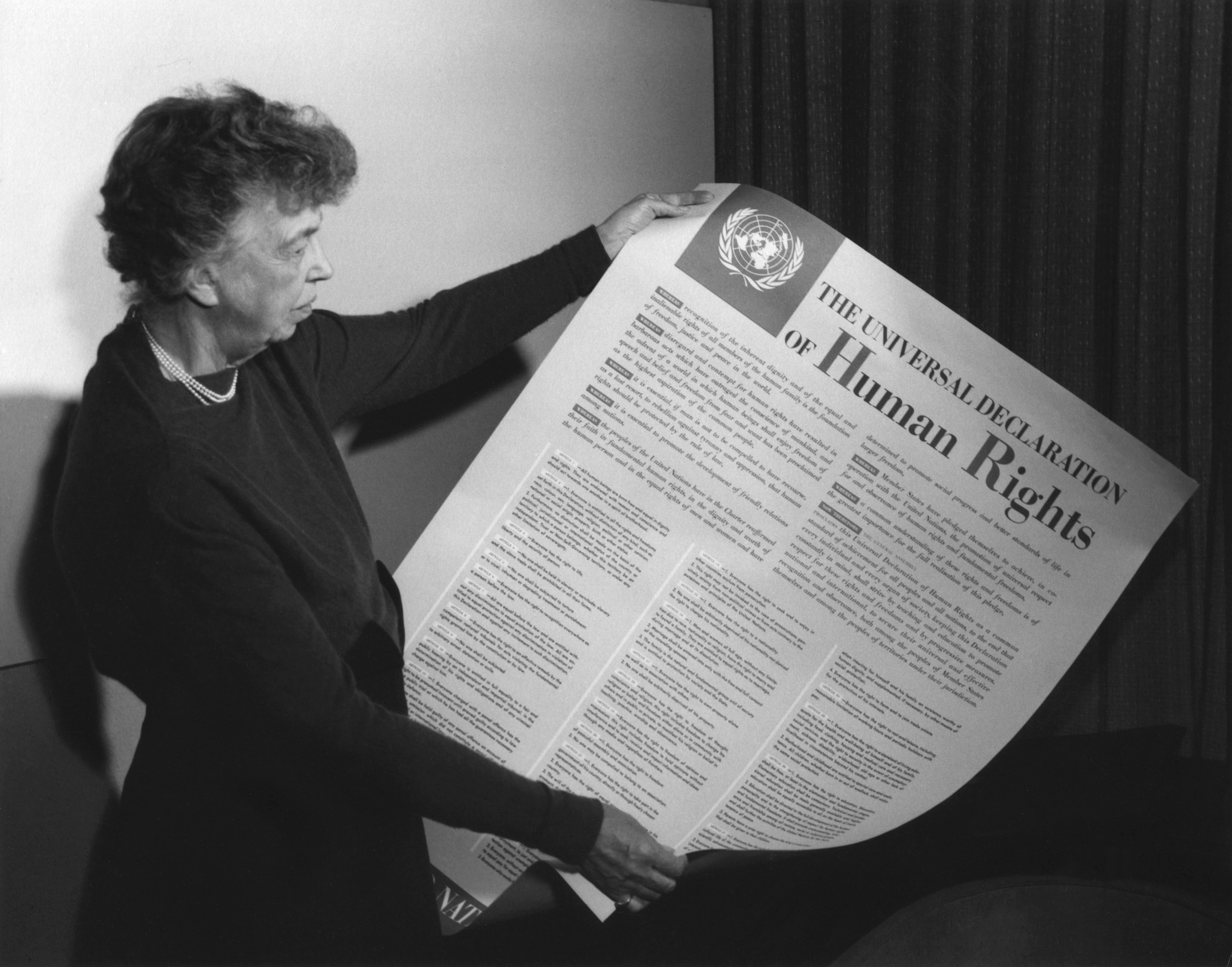
Laws are only observed with the consent of the individuals concerned and a moral change still depends on the individual and not on the passage of any law. ~ Eleanor Roosevelt

Internalization (or internalisation) in sociology and other social sciences is the process of acceptance of a set of norms and values established by people or groups which are influential to the individual through the process of socialization. John Finley Scott described internalization as a metaphor in which something (i.e. an idea, concept, action) moves from outside the mind or personality to a place inside of it. The structure and the happenings of society shapes one's inner self and it can also be reversed.

The process of internalization starts with learning what the norms are, and then the individual goes through a process of understanding why they are of value or why they make sense, until finally they accept the norm as their own viewpoint. Internalized norms are said to be part of an individual's personality and may be exhibited by one's moral actions. However, there can also be a distinction between internal commitment to a norm and what one exhibits externally.

Through internalization individuals accept a set of norms and values that are established by other individuals, groups, or society as a whole.

Norm acceptance, norm conformity and norm compliance can be achieved by coercion, acculturation, or persuasion. But the commitment to the law can be better achieved by process of internalization and legitimacy of law helpful in this process.

According to Marju Luts reception is chiefly defined as the transfer of a legal phenomenon of a different legal culture, other area or other period of time to a new legal climate. Awareness of the recipient that its activity is truly the adoption of an element of law that is, in a legal-cultural context, hitherto alien (or already forgotten). The matter is further specified on the basis of whether such awareness is characteristic of the whole recipient society or only the initiators of reception.

The authors: Chantal Kourilsky-Augeven believe pre-eminence previously given to the transmission processes of values, norms and behavioral models should be renounced in favor of a definition of legal socialization during childhood and adolescence, from the perspective of the subject playing an active part; Law must be considered as a fundamental part of the culture the subject belongs to; The subject acquires the common knowledge of the dominant legal culture in his society by "legal acculturation of the subject"; In parallel occurs the "acculturation by the subject" concerning different objects of the common legal culture. The "legal acculturation of the subject" would thus occur thanks to the transmission by school (or other channels conveying of the common culture), integrating the historical experience assimilated by national culture and fundamental concepts and values of the national legal heritage (in particular regarding the state, the citizen, law or justice) while the subject would himself proceed to the "acculturation of these concepts" in light of the codes of interpretation of reality acquired within his close environment in order to integrate them within his own system of representations.

Judith Torney describes three processes of legal socialization namely, "accumulation process", "identification process" and "role transfer process". In accumulation process, law is learned from range of various sources. In "the identification process", attitudes and values of significant adults are absorbed in a natural psychological process wherein a tendency to adopt beliefs with whom one identifies and is socially bonded makes the impact. Whereas in "the role transfer process" from immediate surroundings like home or school one accepts rule making and implementing authority of the seniors and imputes the same and provides legitimacy to law making and/or enforcing agencies like police.

=== Legal necessity reception ===
Where there is an apparent need for a change of legal system in one culture and another existing culture provides an opportunity to satisfy the need.

=== Legal veneration reception ===
Veneration reception is one example which occurs if alien norms, institutes or a whole system is adopted for their venerated position and prestige of cultural background.

=== Imposed legal reception ===
If a legal phenomenon is imposed upon another nation by force on another nation is referred to as imposed legal reception, in few instances under certain conditions imposed reception may transform into a voluntary process and thus become genuine reception but usually imposed legal phenomenon would not be considered genuine legal reception.

=== Legal transplantation ===
is a process whereby a legal phenomenon transfers to another geographic area or culture together with people. A situation where a norm of another legal culture is established in a different legal climate by enacting legislation regardless of its original implementation background may also be interpreted as a mere transplantation of a legal phenomenon. Transplantation also occurs where a legal theory is taken to another geographical area. As in the case of imposed reception or voluntary reception, an original transplantation may become true reception: of course not among the group or nation which is the carrier of transplantation but among the legal culture surrounding it in the new area. The transformation of transplantation into reception is perhaps of greater significance in the history of legal science than it is in positive law.

=== Methodological and systematic reception ===
in which the spread of legal doctrines and theories plays an especially important role. It is quite clear that the spread of methods brings about the spread of their conceptual and systematic basis. In this regard, system not only refers to a certain classification of legal material, but an internally consistent and systematic approach to law.

== Explicit and implicit legal socialization ==
"Explicit legal socialization", which covers socially obvious aspects of law, consciously identified with what he calls law, should be distinguished from "implicit legal socialization" which regulates every day situations that the subject does not associate with law, due to their familiarity in every day life.

"Implicit" or "subconscious" legal socialization – whereby the subject does not realize it is a matter of law, but thinks it is only ordinary practice – seems as effective as the first type of socialization.

== Approaches ==
- legal socialization measure

Procedural justice (the perceived fairness of legal system i.e. the police, judge, and defense attorney) is related to the overall measure of legal socialization and each of its individual components wise legitimacy, legal cynicism, and moral disengagement

According to Chantal Kourilsky-Augeven, phenomena of individuals' socialization have been developed in three disciplines: psychology, anthropology and sociology. Psychologists, who study at the level of the individual, emphasize the construction of the personality or identity of the subject. Anthropologists start with a specific culture, considered as an entity formed by a group of people who share "ways of thinking, feeling and acting", values and behavioral norms. These common values and norms are then internalized by new generations and ensure the cohesion and continuance of the community. Like anthropologists, sociologists view the object of study from the perspective of society as a whole, but perceive socialization more strongly in terms of the transmission of behavioral norms and models by persons and institutions. They tend to assign to them, for functional purposes, the role of socialization agents. Socialization of subjects is also considered in terms of learning of social roles or attainment of social skills.

These three approaches tend to combine into two schools of thought. The first gives pre-eminence to the subject's viewpoint, but can only consider its development in relation to the interactions with the culture and society in which he is immersed. The second gives pre-eminence to society or culture as a whole, but can only apprehend subjects' modalities of adaptation or participation in this society by looking at modalities of individual development.

== Authority and legitimacy ==
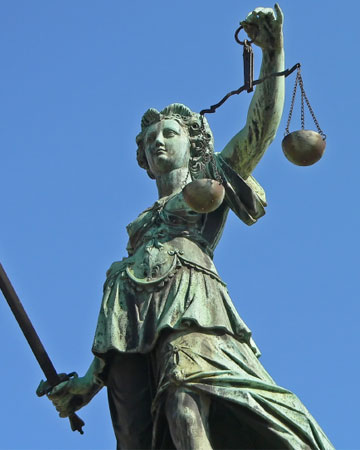
Just laws which uphold human rights are the necessary foundation of peace. ~ Aung San Suu Kyi

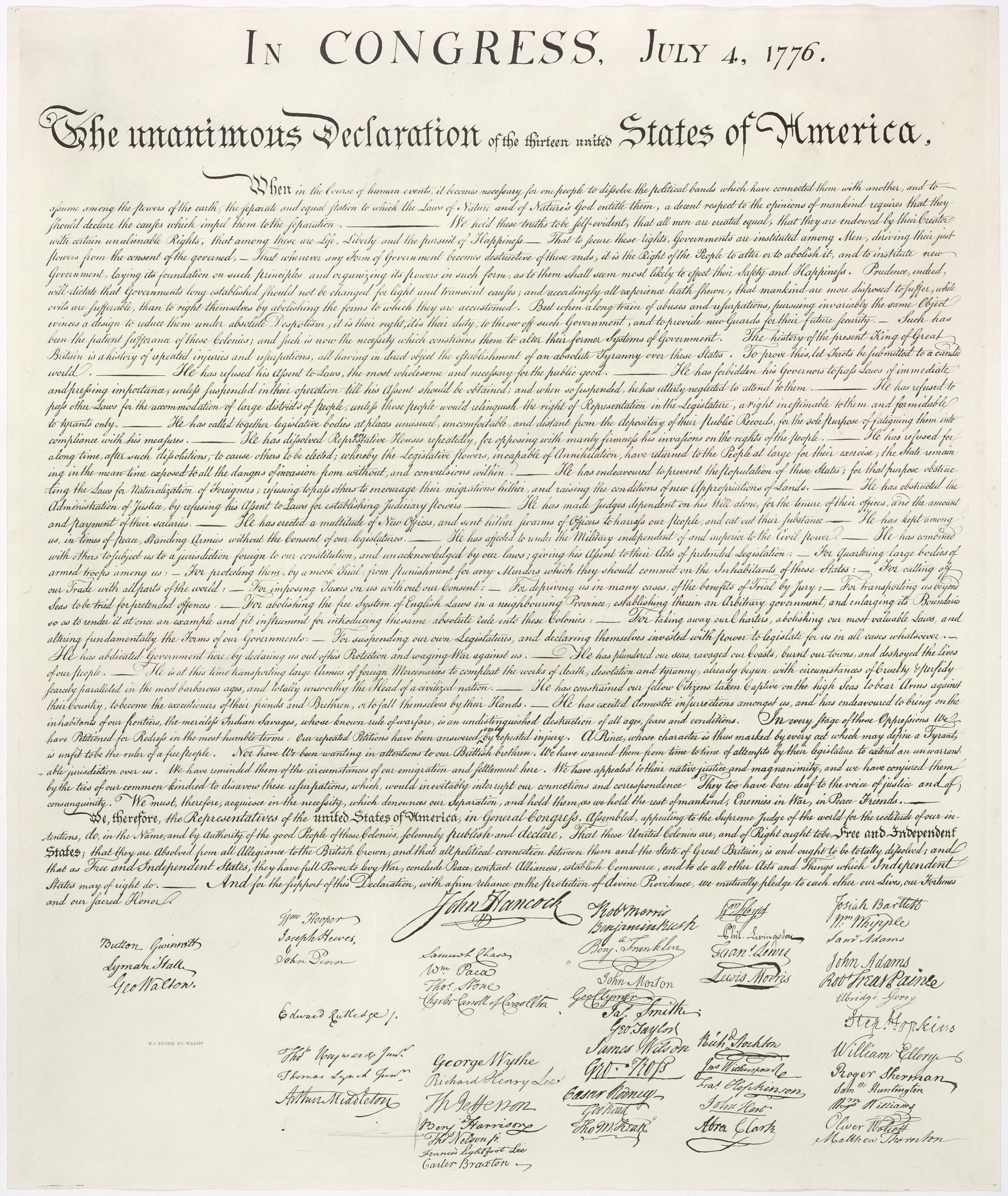
It is not the enactment, but the observance of laws, that creates the character of a nation. ~ Calvin Coolidge

When experiences with legal actors are perceived as fair, just and proportionate, these experiences reinforce the legitimacy of the law, and can contribute to compliance and desistance. However, when punishment is delivered unfairly, unjustly and/or disproportionately, it leads to cynicism about the law, and can contribute to anger and persistence (Sampson and Bartusch, 1998; Kirk and Papachristos, 2011; Papachristos, Meares and Fagan, 2012). It is easier in a democratic and pluralist society to exercise authority through legitimacy, i.e. Acting in ways that people find appropriate, reasonable and just.

According to Tom R. Tyler, People obey the law if they believe it's legitimate, not because they fear punishment—this is the startling conclusion of Tom Tyler's classic study. Tyler suggests that lawmakers and law enforcers would do much better to make legal systems worthy of respect than to try to instill fear of punishment. He finds that people obey law primarily because they believe in respecting legitimate authority. Brute coercive power may achieve obedience but will not sustain it. Only a sense of fairness, trust and legitimacy can do that by nurturing feelings of obligation. When outcomes are fair, and the procedures that lead to those outcomes transparent and just, people will follow rules, cooperate with police, pay fines, and accept punishment. Procedural justice - the experience directly or vicariously of transparency, fairness, neutrality and respect in dealings with criminal justice - is vital for any rule-following behavior.

== Legal socialization among children and youth ==
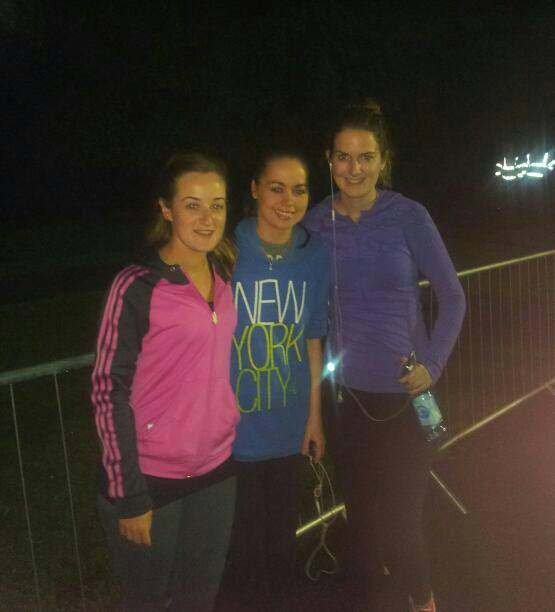
Settled Irish socializing with modern-day traveler to promote integration

In order to better understand representations and behaviors of adults in relation to law and rights, their origin in childhood and adolescence are of relevance. Legal socialization is shaped during adolescence and that these attitudes are influenced by perceptions of fairness of interactions with authority figures and are important because they are related to delinquent behavior. (Fagan & Tyler, 2005). School specific (un-)fairness experiences can affect legal socialization of students.

Youth who perceive their experiences procedural justice being less fair have more negative attitudes about the law, legal system, and moral rules and codes. Youth with more negative views of the legal system and moral codes participate in more delinquent behavior. Legitimacy and moral disengagement components and overall measure of legal socialization are related to higher levels of delinquent behavior.

== See also ==
- Law
- Legal anthropology
- Philosophy of law
- Socialization
- Acculturation
- Civics
- Sociology of law
- legal culture
- Legal awareness
- Legal aid
- Legal empowerment
- Juvenile delinquency
- Morality
- Ethics
- Doctrine of reception
