= Legal system =

Set of legal norms

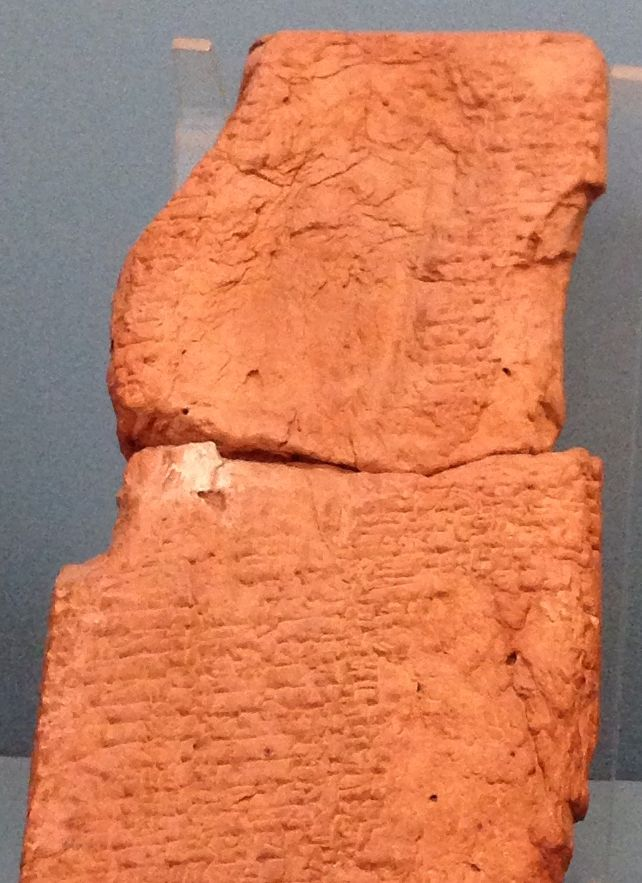
Code of Ur-Nammu, setting forth the legal system that governed Ur in the third millennium BC.

A legal system is a set of legal norms, institutions, and processes by which those norms are applied, often within a particular jurisdiction or community. It may also be referred to as a legal order. The comparative study of legal systems is the subject matter of comparative law, while the definition of legal systems in the abstract has been largely the domain of legal philosophy. Although scholarship has largely focused on national legal systems, many other distinct legal systems exist; for example, in Canada, in addition to the Canadian legal system there are numerous Indigenous legal systems.

The term "legal system" is often used to refer specifically to the laws of a particular nation state. Some countries have a single legal system, while others may have multiple overlapping legal systems arising from distinct sources of sovereign authority, as is often the case in federal states. In addition, different groups within a country are sometimes subject to different legal systems; this is known as legal pluralism. International law is also sometimes classified as a legal system, but this classification is disputed.

Legal systems vary in their sources of law and the extent to which they are based on formal written law; some civil law systems have been based exclusively on statutory law, while some customary law systems are based entirely on oral tradition.

Legal systems are classified in many different ways. One popular classification divides them into the civil law tradition, common law tradition, religious law systems, customary law systems, and mixed legal systems. Modern scholarship, however, has moved away from these fixed categories toward an understanding of legal systems as drawing from multiple legal traditions or patterns.

== Definitions and scope ==
Legal systems have been defined in various ways. In one influential definition by John Henry Merryman, a legal system is "an operating set of legal institutions, procedures, and rules."

Depending on the definition, a legal system may contain only the set of laws or legal norms issuing from a particular sovereign authority or bound by a shared underlying norm or set of rules, or it may also include for example the institutions and processes by which those laws or legal norms are interpreted and given effect.

The 19th century legal positivist John Austin distinguished legal systems from one another based on the sovereign from which the laws flowed. A similar analysis had been proposed some centuries earlier by Francisco de Vitoria. Under Austin's analysis, any law that is part of a legal system must have been enacted by the same sovereign legislator. The 20th century Austrian scholar Hans Kelsen took a different approach, in which all legal norms in a legal system must arise from a single underlying basic norm.

English theorist H.L.A. Hart argued instead that each legal system is defined by a shared rule of recognition under which a pronouncement is recognized as valid law.

These positivist accounts of the legal system have been challenged from various perspectives. 20th century scholarship on legal pluralism emphasized that many legal norms do not arise from an identifiable government or sovereign, and therefore legal systems could not be defined simply based on the sovereign. H. Patrick Glenn argued that legal systems were a structurally inadequate way of thinking about law because they failed to capture the epistemic and ill-defined nature of law, arguing for legal traditions as a better unit of analysis.

Scholarly opinions on whether international law is a legal system have varied. Kelsen viewed international law as either included in all national legal systems, or an overarching legal system of which the national legal systems were subordinate parts. H.L.A. Hart considered international law to be law, but not a legal system, because it lacked a rule of recognition, rule of change, or rule of adjudication. However, it is increasingly considered to be a legal system. The origin of this view of international law is credited to the 18th century German legal theorist Georg Friedrich von Martens.

Although the terms "legal order" and "legal system" are commonly used interchangeably, some writers have distinguished them. A number of legal positivists have used one term to refer to the set of legal norms in effect in a territory at a particular moment, and the other to refer to the set of legal norms over time. Theorists such as Eugenio Bulygin and Carlos Alchourrón use "legal order" to refer to the momentary state of the "legal system", while others including Andrzej Grabowski use "legal system" in the opposite sense, to refer to the momentary state of the "legal order".

== Classifications ==
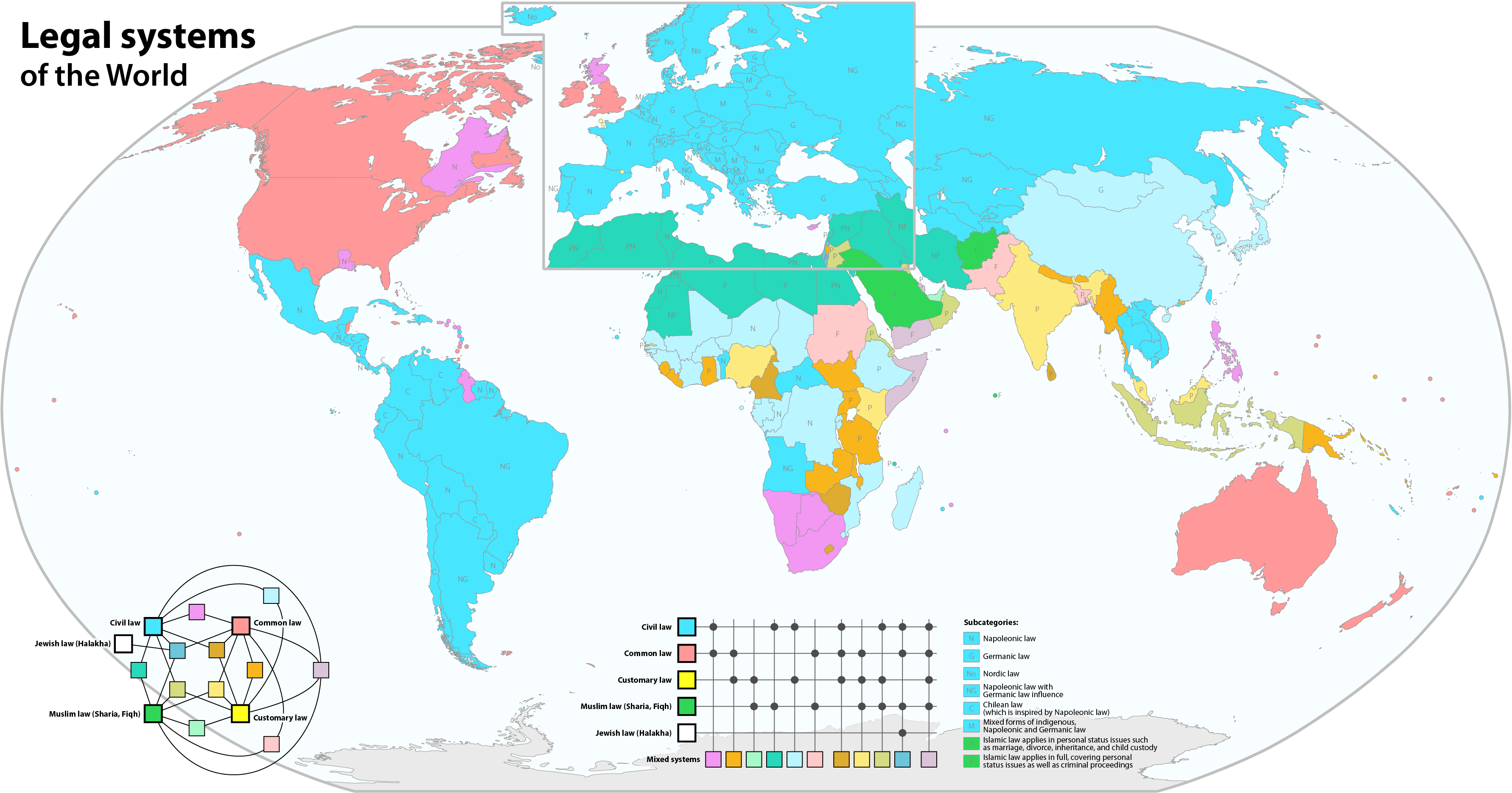
National legal systems classified by legal tradition, as common law, civil law, Islamic law, Jewish law, or mixed.

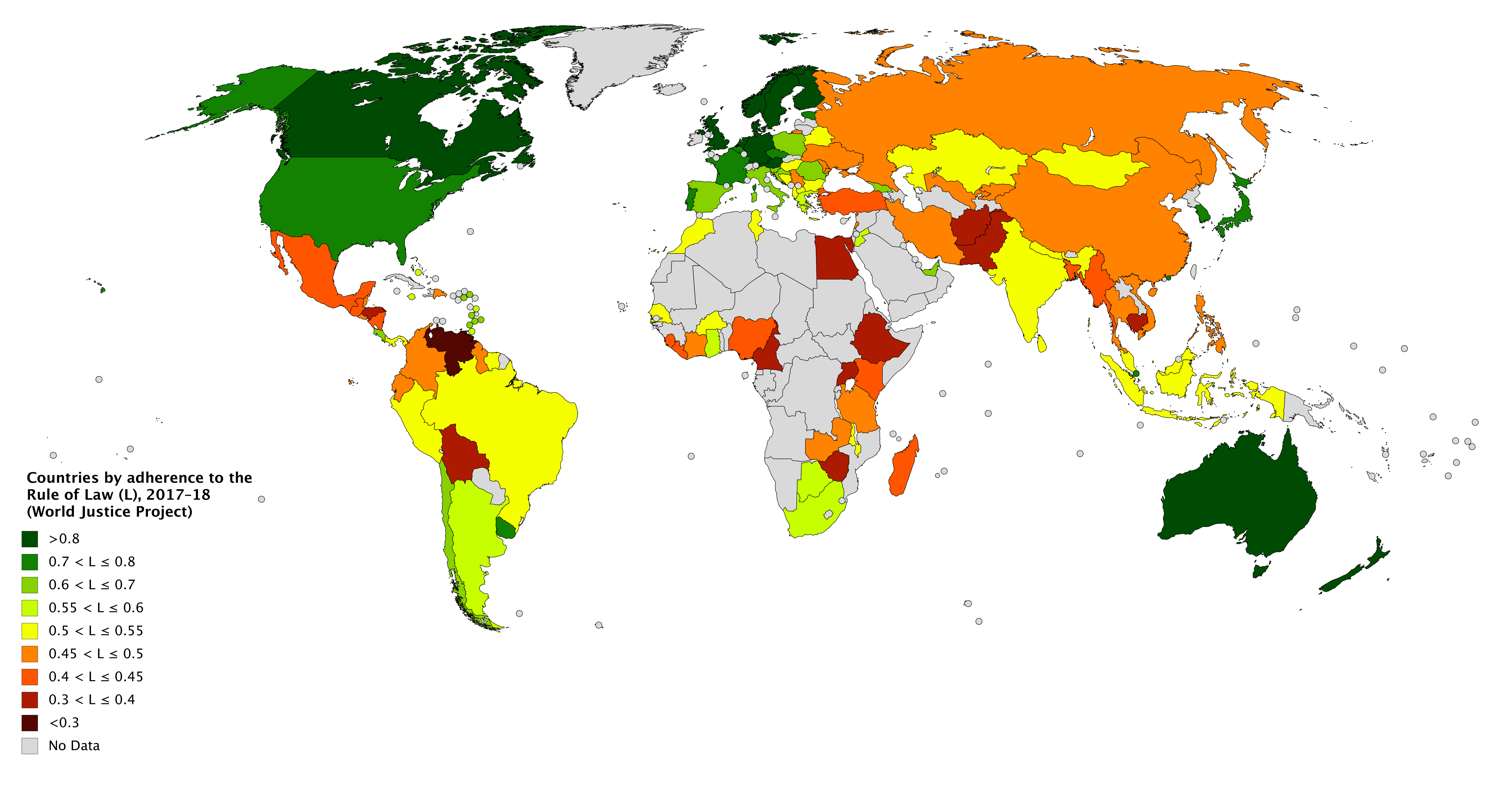
National legal systems classified by their adherence to the rule of law according to the World Justice Project, 2018.

Various different taxonomies of legal systems have been proposed, for example into families or traditions on historic and stylistic grounds. One common division is between the civil law tradition and the common law tradition, which covers most modern countries that are not governed by customary law or religious law or a mixed system. The distinction between civil law and common law legal systems has become less useful over time as the two groups have become more similar to one other, and also less cohesive as some members of each group have become more different from others.

Some analysts also consider socialist legal systems to constitute a separate group. The Nordic legal tradition, encompassing the legal systems of Scandinavia and Iceland, may also be considered a separate group of legal systems. However, both of these are more commonly considered subgroups of the civil law tradition.

Prior to the late 20th century, mixed legal systems were rarely taken into account in classifications of legal systems, but today they are recognized as the most common case: a 2000 study of world legal systems found 92 mixed legal systems, 91 civil law systems, and 42 common law systems.

Classifications of legal systems have often reflected the classifier's view of geopolitical power relations. In 1909, Adhémar Esmein proposed classifying legal systems into Roman, Germanic, Anglo-Saxon, Slavic, and Islamic groups, which corresponded to the five major global empires of the time. This classification ignored, among others, the legal systems of Africa, China, and Japan, which Esmein did not consider significant. In 1913, Georges Sauser-Hall proposed an explicitly racial classification of legal systems into Indo-European, Semitic, and Mongolian. In 1928, the American scholar John Henry Wigmore proposed a five-part classification of legal systems: primitive, ancient, Euro-American, religious, and "Afro-Asian". Wigmore's approach, the first to elevate the United States to top-level significance and the first to take Indigenous legal systems into account, was also noteworthy for erasing the distinctions among the different European legal traditions.

In the postwar period, the influential French comparatist René David classified the world's legal systems into four broad groups: Romano-Germanic, common law, socialist law, and "other conceptions of law and the social order". This classification represented a French Cold War worldview, with the Romano-Germanic legal systems epitomized by France, common law systems by the United States, and socialist law systems by the USSR. David also acknowledged, but gave lesser importance to, the Islamic, Hindu, and traditional Chinese legal traditions. David's classification remained highly influential for several decades. However, in the late 20th century it came under attack for being excessively scientistic and nationalistic.

In 1973, German comparatists Konrad Zweigert and Hein Kötz proposed a similar classification that recognized "Romanist" (typified by France), "Germanic", Anglo-American, Scandinavian, Socialist, Hindu, Islamic, and "Far Eastern" groups of legal systems, which were all distinguished from one another on stylistic grounds.

Until the 1990s, these classifications of legal systems into family groups were typically considered rigid and fixed over time. But through the scholarship of H. Patrick Glenn this metaphor of static legal families has been supplanted by the concept of legal traditions, in which hybrid or mixed systems are the norm rather than the exception.

In 1997, Ugo Mattei proposed classifying legal systems according to their social constraints, and particularly the degree to which they adhered to three patterns: "rule of professional law", "rule of political law", and "rule of traditional law", from which all legal systems drew to some extent. The paradigmatic examples of these three patterns were the United States, Cuba, and Saudi Arabia, respectively.

In contrast to these historic and stylistic classifications, some organizations have developed classifications and rankings of legal systems based on particular metrics. For example, the World Justice Project ranks national legal systems annually by their adherence to the rule of law.

== In legal translation ==
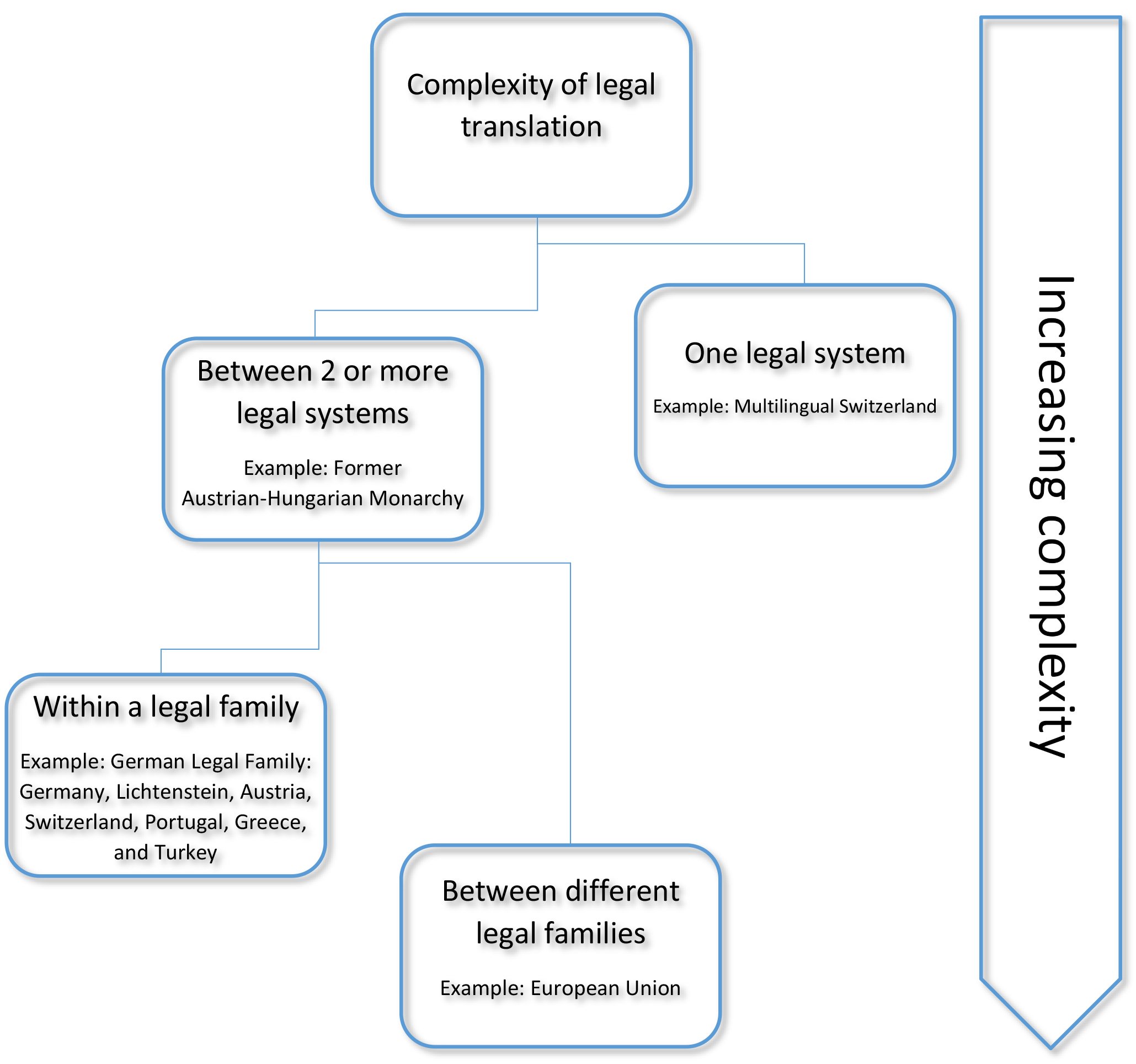
Diagram showing the increasing complexity of translation as the legal systems involved become more disparate.

A distinguishing feature of legal translation compared to other forms of translation is that it often involves translating not only between languages but also between legal systems. A translator tasked, for example, with translating a legal document from one language and legal system into another language that is not used in the source legal system but is spoken in multiple other legal systems (for example, a German legal document into French) must decide which legal system's legal language and conceptual framework to use in the translation.

The classification of legal systems is also of practical importance in legal translation because it governs the difficulty of the translator's task: the more closely related two legal systems are, the more straightforward the translation process is. The difficulties in translating between common and civil law legal systems is particularly well-known. Thus for example, even though Finnish and Swedish are unrelated languages, the similarities between the Finnish and Swedish legal systems makes the translation process more straightforward than translating a legal document between dissimilar systems.

== See also ==
- Indigenous law
