= Indigenous law =

Indigenous legal systems

Diagram of Australian Aboriginal ways of learning based on work by Tyson Yungaporta.

The various legal systems of Indigenous nations are known as Indigenous law or, less commonly, Indigenous legal orders. It is a broad category for many independent, distinct and non-universal legal systems that each exist within and are defined by their particular social and environmental context. Indigenous law includes the political institutions that allow an Indigenous nation to govern their traditional territory. It also includes economic and social life and is generally broader than Western legal systems. Historically, it was abolished, repressed, used and distorted by colonial powers, in the process sometimes creating customary legal systems.

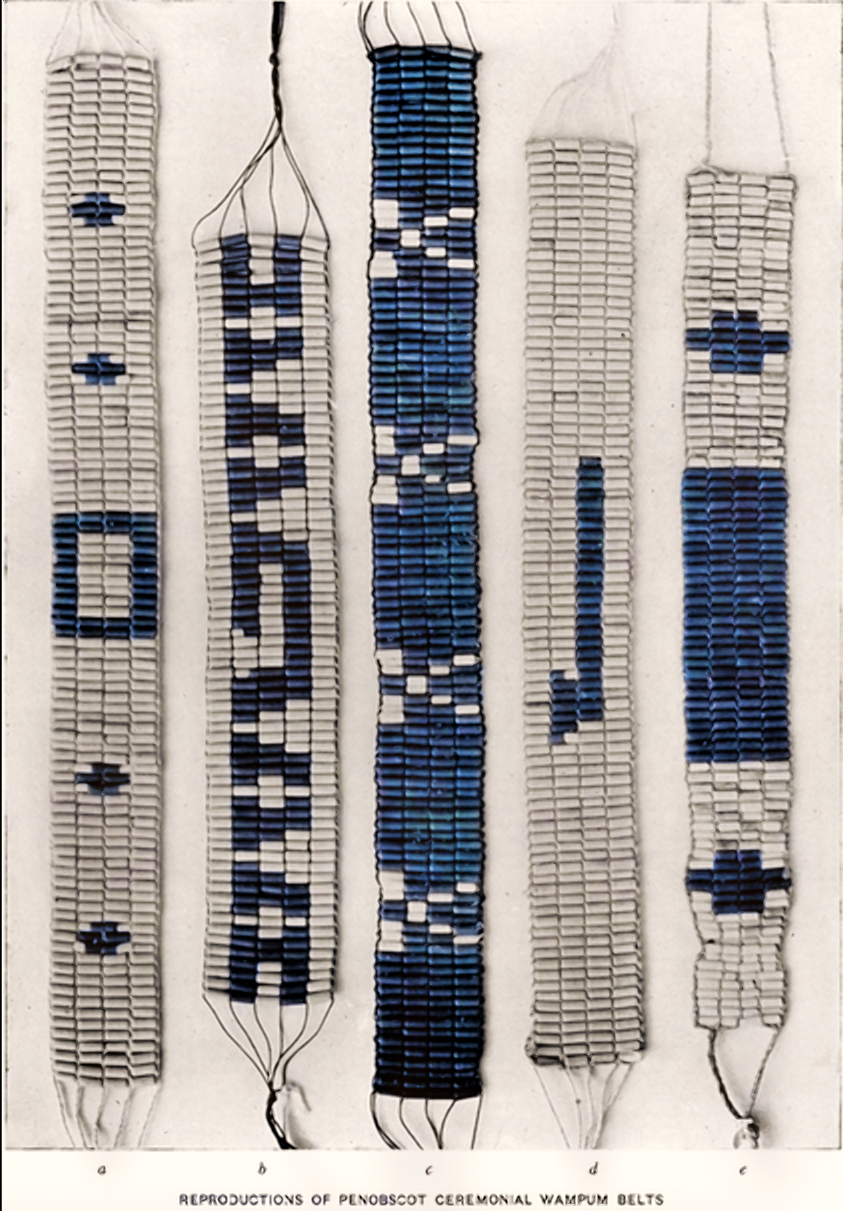
A series of wampum belts used by the Wabanaki Confederacy.

== Overview ==
Indigenous law is the institutions, actions and principles that govern an Indigenous nation's traditional territories and people. It is a process that enables large groups of Indigenous people to navigate conflicts and disagreements about their political, economic and social life. Legal precedent is often held in oral traditions and stories told to all and thus accessible to all citizens. Jurist John Borrows recognizes at least six sources for Indigenous law: sacred law, deliberative law, customary law, positive law, natural law and relationality. Indigenous legal orders often pull from more than one of these sources and together they form an inseparable joint system. Legitimate practice of law is done through employing relevant precedent on a case-by-case basis. Like all legal systems, it is socially determined and changes over the generations.

Indigenous law is a broad big tent category that includes countless independent, distinct and nonuniversal legal systems (contrast universal law). Indigenous law includes governance and judicial concerns like Western law, but reframes and expands beyond that to include meaning-making, instructions for living, and relationships between various nonhuman persons and the land, oftentimes giving them legal personhood and rights. Its domain and practice include many things scholars study disparately, such as decision-making, rules, songs, myths, kinship, legends, place names, traditional knowledge, relationships, politics, religion, lifeworlds, ethics, ceremony, spirituality, oral histories, customary laws, art, dances, dreams, folklore, philosophy, traditions and tales. Indigenous law is localized in particular places and best understood in context through direct relationship with that place and the people living there.

Legal institutions in Indigenous societies tend to be horizontal and ordinary citizens are responsible for their maintenance. Indigenous legal institutions are circularly reinforcing with their economies, land tenure systems and culture. Val Napoleon views the purpose of Indigenous law as, "...building citizenship, responsibility and governance, challenging internal and external oppressions, safety and protection, lands and resources, and external political relations with other Indigenous peoples and the state."

Laura Mae Lindo speaking at the Indigenous Legal Forum.

Customary law and Indigenous law are oftentimes conflated. However, scholars argue that customary law is not the sole root of Indigenous legal systems and that customary law includes many legal systems that are wholly distinct from Indigenous ones. Indigenous law has been progressively incorporated piecemeal into colonial common and customary law, which dilutes and disempowers Indigenous law and self-governance. Some Indigenous communities also dislike the conflation of Indigenous and customary law, with Australian Aboriginals preferring to use terms within their own languages to describe their legal systems, a sentiment shared by Gitxsan citizen Val Napoleon. Use of custom to describe Indigenous law is perceived as an attempt to create a hierarchy with Western law on top and 'custom' on the bottom.

Sometimes forms of settler law such as Canadian Aboriginal law, Australian Aboriginal law and (United States) Federal Indian law are also conflated with Indigenous law. These systems typically refer to the colonial power's laws as they apply to Indigenous peoples. While it is about and used by Indigenous peoples, settler law ultimately comes from the perspectives of European settler society and is imposed upon Indigenous peoples.

== History ==
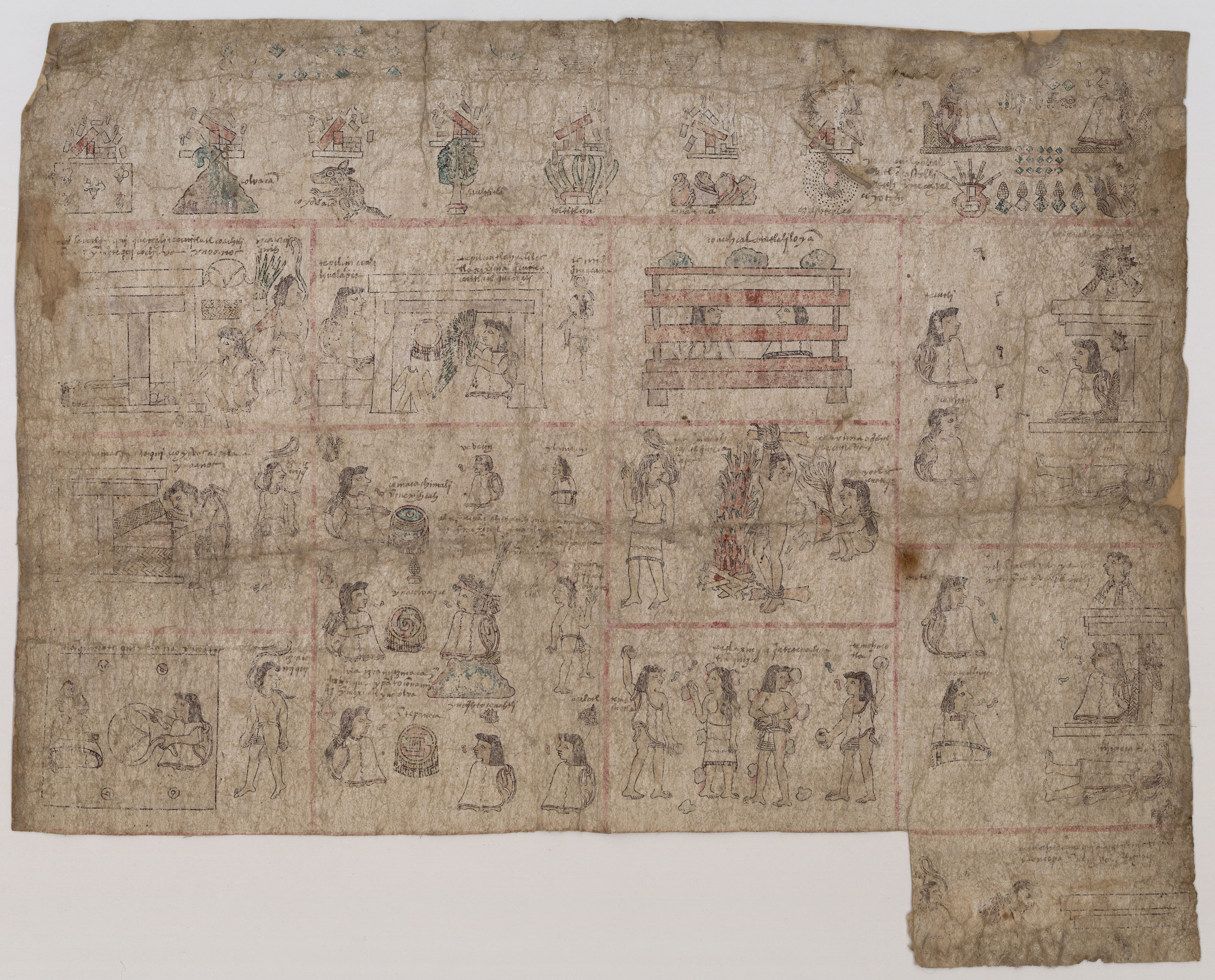
Image of Leaf 3 of the Mapa Quinatzin, a 16th-century Indigenous pictoral document written in Mexico. This leaf depicts various crimes and their respective punishments according to the laws established by Nezahualcoyotl of Texcoco, including adultery and robbery.

During European colonization, Indigenous legal systems were displaced in favor of Western law through abolition, modification, and regulation by European states. These modified and regulated structures, in tandem with Western law, grew into what's called customary law. For example, the Spanish Empire initially used Indigenous legal systems such as Quipu to govern their colonies but they later systematically destroyed these systems. The destruction is traditionally attributed to the Spanish trying to destroy Indigenous religions but may have also been an attempt to suppress Indigenous legal orders. Indigenous legal terms and methods were, on the surface, sometimes kept but how they worked was changed to fit a European conception, such as the shifting of the traditional Mesoamerican nobility to follow European norms and expectations. In other cases, Indigenous terms were displaced by Spanish ones in a form of erasure. For example, titles for wise people and local leaders were unrecognized by the colonial regime and instead consolidated into Principales. The Spanish accommodated Indigenous law because the legitimacy of the crown wasn't solely dependent on natural or divine law but in the consent of his vassals. The crown presented their choices as forging a fairer legal system relative to the past. This process led to a need for rigorous understanding and documentation of Indigenous legal systems, some of these works have survived into the present.

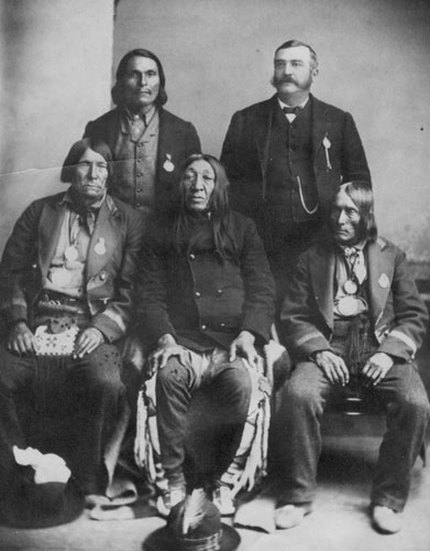
Picture of Cree chiefs.

In New Spain, Indigenous law could be used in a limited way within the setter court system as long as it was framed using Christian ideology and logic. For example, Alonso de la Cruz described Indigenous law as a form of natural law and used this to argue Indigenous dominion over their lands and for their self-government. Indigenous communities also had partial self-government in the form of town councils, including being able to run their own court systems and use their own languages.

This contrasts sharply with British colonization, where a clear frontier line and reservations marked the boundaries where Western law began and Indigenous law ended. Indigenous nations were sovereign countries, not vassals of the British crown operating within the British legal system. Thus, treaties and international relations governed British interactions with Native Americans rather than courts like in the Spanish colonies. Regardless, throughout the colonial period, Indigenous nations asserted their authority to decide how their territory was governed. For example, Anishinaabeg would make treaties and alliances among each other and their neighbors, offering wampum, pipes and drums to ratify these agreements. They also coordinated against the colonial powers who were settling and seizing lands and failing to uphold treaty rights. Anishinaabeg kept neighboring communities up to date on settler activities and shared advice on how to handle them.

Beginning with the rise of nation-states in the Americas, Indigenous peoples and their law were marginalized to construct a uniform, homogeneous nation-state centered on a white European identity carried out by autonomous individual men. This marginalized women, mestizos and Indigenous peoples alongside their perspectives. Indigenous peoples were separated from their past and living Indigenous peoples were viewed as degenerated, if not claimed to be wholly different groups. To most intellectual elites at the time, law was simply the written system of norms mandated by a state. Most refused to consider the possibility of precolonial history or states in the Americas, so they excluded Indigenous law entirely. As part of the broader trend of salvage anthropology, a few marginal scholars were writing about Inca and Aztec governance.

By the 1920s, the field grew beyond salvage anthropology, and work on Indigenous law became concentrated among anthropologists studying 'social laws'. In Latin America, Indigenous law became redefined partially through the lens of Indigenismo in line with anthropology as just 'expressions of culture.' Continuity between past and present Indigenous peoples was increasingly recognized by Latin American settler communities and Indigenous law began to be incorporated into the homogeneous national narratives as part of the assimilation process. In the aftermath of World War 2, anthropology also started recognizing continuity, which led to the formation of the multidisciplinary field of ethnohistory, which began to take up a lot of Indigenous research. In the 90s, legal scholarship began to move on from the binary between states and nonstates and began incorporating legal pluralism.

Image of a Quipu.

== Challenges ==
For many Indigenous legal systems, many of the written sources are from the perspective of the colonial power and in the language of that particular time, which can distort how the system actually worked. Even for peoples who had written texts, such as many Mesoamerican peoples, few of these texts survived into the present day or can no longer be read (like Quipu). The fields of archaeology, history, anthropology, epigraphy, and ethnohistory are all sometimes used to get a clearer picture of Indigenous law.

Historically, scholars studying Indigenous law often ignored Indigenous sources in favor of accounts written by settler communities and did little critical analysis of the reliability or accuracy of these sources. A critical perspective starts showing up in literature in the 1980s. Although many Indigenous legal orders have survived in the present, there are often gaps where Indigenous law is undermined, distorted or lost due to colonialism. This makes immediate recognition and use of Indigenous law difficult. Instead, the gaps in Indigenous law need to be rebuilt for them to be fully applicable. Without Indigenous law, Indigenous communities have also struggled to maintain their distinct communities on their ancestral lands when constrained by colonial legal orders.

== Examples ==
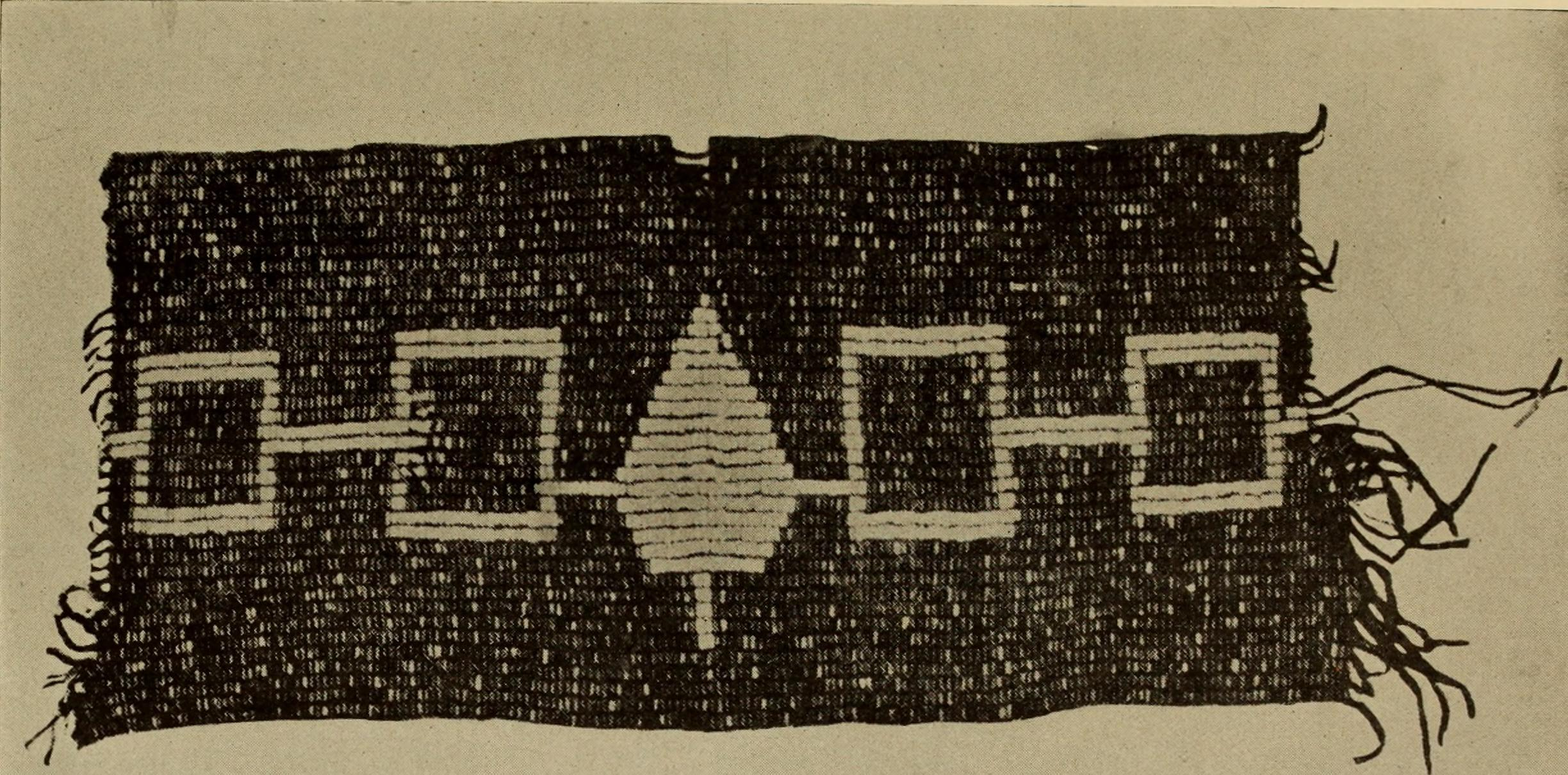
Image of the Hiawatha belt.

For examples of customary law, see List of customary legal systems.

=== Cree law ===
Cree governance includes four main legal institutions: elders, family, medicine people and the community at large each that have their own roles and their own kinds of decisions they deal with. Kinship relations are a web of responsibilities and obligations that guide a Cree person on how to act.

== See also ==
- Akitsiraq Law School
- Australian Aboriginal elder
- Chthonic law
- Condolence ceremony
- Drumkeeper
- Earth jurisprudence
- Eeyou Istchee
- Elder (administrative title)
- Elder rights
- Faithkeeper
- Firekeeper
- Ghigau
- Indigenous land rights
- Indigenous law in Canada
- Kānāwai Māmalahoe
- Kulhulmcilh
- Land law
- Law and religion
- Legal tradition
- Maya monarchs
- Miꞌkmaꞌki
- Moral patienthood
- Political naturalism
- Political representation of nature
- Political systems of the Asante Empire
- Potlatch
- Sachem
- Seven generation sustainability
- Shakes (Tlingit leaders)
- Social norm
- Tribal court
- Wabanaki Confederacy
- Waxvwuisaxv
- Weroance
- Yakoyaner
