= John Borrows =

Canadian jurist (born 1983)

- Kegedonce (Anishinaabe)
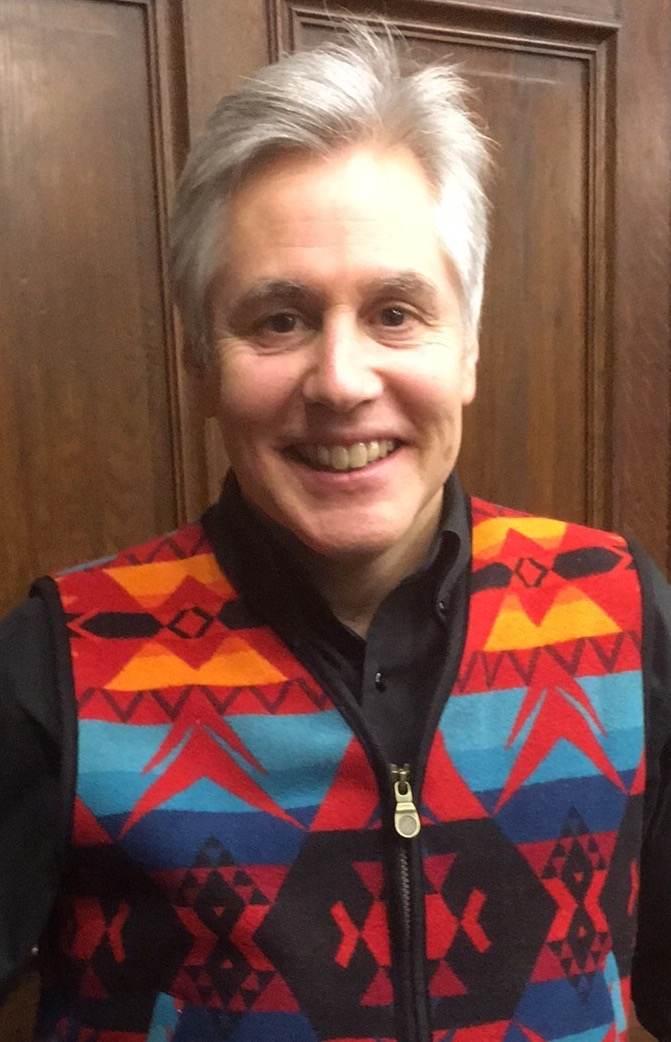
- Borrows in 2019
- Born: 1963 (age 62–63)
- Occupations: Lawyer, academic
- Known for: Canadian Indigenous law
- Title: Professor at the University of Toronto Faculty of Law

Academic background
- Education: Osgoode Hall Law School; University of Toronto Faculty of Law; University of Toronto

John Borrows OC FRSC (or Kegedonce in Anishinaabe) is a Canadian academic and jurist. He is a full Professor of Law and the Loveland Chair in Indigenous Law at the University of Toronto Faculty of Law. He is known as a leading authority on Canadian Indigenous law and constitutional law and has been cited by the Supreme Court of Canada. John Borrows is a member of the Church of Jesus Christ of Latter-day Saints.

== Early life and education ==
Borrows is Anishinaabe/Ojibway, and a member of the Chippewas of the Nawash First Nation in Ontario, Canada.

Borrows grew up near the Cape Croker reserve on Georgian Bay in Ontario. Borrows's mother ran away in order to escape being sent to a residential school. Borrows credits her with teaching him about Indigenous laws while he grew up on the land that his family farmed. Borrows's uncle was a former chief, a great-grandfather was a long-serving councillor, and his great-great-grandfather was one of the signatories to a land treaty with the Crown.

Borrows received a Bachelor of Arts and a Master of Arts from the University of Toronto in politics and history. He went on to earn his Juris Doctor and Master of Laws at the University of Toronto Faculty of Law, and his Doctor of Philosophy at Osgoode Hall Law School. While he was at Osgoode, he started an international Indigenous legal exchange program, which is still active as of November 2018.

== Career ==
Borrows taught at the University of British Columbia Faculty of Law from 1992 until 1998, where he was the first First Nations Legal Studies Director. While there, he helped create an Indigenous Peoples' legal clinic to serve members of Vancouver's Downtown Eastside, which is still active as of November 2018.

From 1998, until 2001, Borrows taught law at the University of Toronto Faculty of Law, where he helped start the June Callwood program in Aboriginal law. In 1999, Borrows worked in the newly created northern territory of Nunavut to help develop its legal infrastructure. He taught as part of the Akitsiraq Law School, which was a temporary branch of the University of Victoria Faculty of Law.

In 2001, Borrows joined the University of Victoria Faculty of Law (UVic), teaching there for most of the next decade. By 2003, Borrows became the Law Foundation chair in Aboriginal justice at the UVic. Later, he also taught at the University of Melbourne, the University of Waikato Law School in New Zealand, and the University of Minnesota, where he was the Robina Chair in Law and Society.

In 2015, Borrows returned to the University of Victoria. In 2017, he became the Canada Research Chair in Indigenous Law.

In 2022, Borrows joined the University of Toronto Faculty of Law as the inaugural Loveland Chair in Indigenous Law.

After the retirement of Chief Justice Beverley McLachlin from the Supreme Court of Canada, there was widespread speculation that Borrows was a leading contender to be the first Indigenous jurist to sit on the country's top court. Ultimately, the seat went to Sheilah Martin, which led to Indigenous legal figures such as Scott Robertson, the president of the Indigenous Bar Association to publicly express their disappointment with Prime Minister Justin Trudeau's decision not to pick an Indigenous person. According to the Toronto Star, Borrows's name was not on the shortlist, so either he did not apply or did not make it to the final shortlist.

Borrows, along with his colleague Val Napoleon, was instrumental in creating the joint common law and Indigenous law degree (JD/JID) program at the University of Victoria Faculty of Law, the first program in a Canadian law school to allow an integrated study of the Canadian common law and indigenous legal traditions. The program is a four-year program, and opened in Fall 2018.

Borrows has been involved in the Indigenous Law programs at Osgoode Hall, the University of Windsor Faculty of Law, Western Law, and McGill University Faculty of Law. Borrows was also a visiting professor at Arizona State University College of Law, University of New South Wales, Waikato University, Brigham Young University, University of Arizona, Princeton University, and McGill University.

== Impact ==
Borrows is known as a leading authority on Canadian indigenous law and constitutional law and has been cited multiple times by the Supreme Court of Canada.

Pamela Palmater, the chair of Indigenous governance at Toronto Metropolitan University, credits Borrows, Val Napoleon and Taiaiake Alfred at the University of Victoria, and Glen Coulthard at the University of British Columbia with a sea change in the study of Indigenous law in Canada in the last two decades from Canadian law applied to Indigenous peoples to actual Indigenous law.

== Honours and awards ==
Borrows was awarded a National Aboriginal Achievement Award for his legal work. He has also been a Fellow of the Trudeau Foundation, and a Fellow of the Academy of Arts, Humanities and Sciences of Canada (RSC) of the Royal Society of Canada (Canada's highest academic honor). In 2012, he received the Indigenous Peoples Counsel (I.P.C.) from the Indigenous Bar Association.

In 2017, Borrows won the Killam Prize for Social Science. In 2018, was named one of the twenty-five most influential lawyers in Canada.

Borrows has also received several honorary degrees, including one from Dalhousie University. In 2018, he received an honorary doctorate from York University.

Borrows was made an officer of the Order of Canada in 2021.

== Works ==
- First Nations and the Law. Part II (1992)
- Aboriginal Legal Issues (1998)
- Recovering Canada: The Resurgence of Indigenous Law. (2002)
- Recovering Canada: The Resurgence of Indigenous Law. (2017)
- The Seven Cycles of Life: Seeking Healing, Connection and Justice in Anishinaabe Teachings (2026)
