= Legal culture =

Social and behavioural norms and expectations in legal systems

Legal cultures are described as being temporary outcomes of interactions and occur pursuant to a challenge and response paradigm. Analyses of core legal paradigms shape the characteristics of individual and distinctive legal cultures. "Comparative legal cultures are examined by a field of scholarship, which is situated at the line bordering comparative law and historical jurisprudence."

Lawrence M. Friedman's definition of legal culture is that it is "the network of values and attitudes relating to law, which determines when and why and where people turn to law or government, or turn away."

Legal cultures can be examined by reference to fundamentally different legal systems. However, such cultures can also be differentiated between systems with a shared history and basis which are now otherwise influenced by factors that encourage cultural change. Students learn about legal culture in order to better understand how the law works in society. This can be seen as the study of Law and Society. These studies are available at schools such as Drake University in Des Moines, Iowa.

== Western vs non-Western legal culture ==
Western legal culture is unified in the systematic reliance on legal constructs. Such constructs include corporations, contracts, estates, rights and powers. These concepts are not only nonexistent in primitive or traditional legal systems but they can also be predominantly incapable of expression in those language systems which form the basis of such legal cultures.

As a general proposition, the concept of legal culture depends on language and symbols and any attempt to analyze non-western legal systems in terms of categories of modern western law can result in distortion attributable to differences in language. So while legal constructs are unique to classical Roman, modern civil and common law cultures, legal concepts or primitive and archaic law get their meaning from sensed experience based on facts as opposed to theory or abstract. Legal culture therefore in the former group is influenced by academics, learned members of the profession and historically, philosophers. The latter group's culture is harnessed by beliefs, values and religion at a foundational level.

Historical studies of European 'cultures of law' have focused on the problem of explaining the context in which law operates, and how to understand the expectations and perceptions of law, justice and authority among the members of different groups who made use of legal norms, tools and fora.

Traditional law in Africa is based on natural justice and lacks abstract concepts. This is characteristic of cultures that have an absence of written language, which is necessary to elaborate concepts into theory. The doctrines of traditional African law are based on social considerations whereby parties to disputes seek not declarations of right or wrong but rather they seek restitution of social relationships.

The trier of fact and law adjudicates between closely related people from communities as opposed to strangers in commerce. Judgments stress the importance of living together in generous, loving kindness, mutual helpfulness and reciprocity. Evidence suggests that 'African law demonstrates that all men, because they live in society, have some theory of rules of justice which they believe arise from reason itself; [and Gluckman's evidence] suggests that Africans may well have formulated, in embryonic form at least, a theory of natural justice coming from human kindness itself.'

The Islamic legal system exemplifies law as part of a larger culture where the concepts of knowledge, right and human nature play a central role. A case study by Lawrence Rosen explains the anthropological, procedural and judicial discretion aspects of bringing a case to court in Sefrou, Morocco. The case study makes explicit those fundamentals in Islamic society that shape Islamic legal culture and differentiate this from western legal cultures.

Rigid procedural rules and strict court room decorum or etiquette which is entrenched in western legal cultures clears the way for a more natural process of dispute resolution. In Morocco, close attention is paid to social origins, connections and identity where these concepts influence a qadi's (judge) judicial interrogation and discretion.

While the systems of law found in the western world consist of conceptualisation and implementation that mimic the extrajudicial world only slightly, in the Islamic courts of Morocco, the culture of law being propounded reflects the overall culture of its people. This is attributable to the goals of law in Islamic society, which is not to hold state or religious power as supreme or to develop an exacting body of legal doctrine, but to restore relationships and then facilitate the resolution of disputes independently of rigid precedent.

== Western comparisons ==
The traditional focus between common law culture and civil law culture has been highlighted by court room procedure, whereby the former nurtures an adversarial environment and the latter an inquisitorial one. Indeed no system of court procedure can ever be purely adversarial or purely inquisitorial.

In fact France, which subscribes to a civil legal system, historically gave the judge a passive role and left the parties to engage in an accusatorial manner. Nonetheless the common law culture predominately consists of oral arguments where legal representors steer the case in search of justice and reinforcement of rights.

The use of a Jury in the common law as a judge of fact is unique when compared to civil law systems. The Jury are triers of fact in both civil and criminal cases and this reflects a particular culture of law; namely the direct involvement of society in the legal framework. In France a judge's role as trier of law and fact is merely as an administrator without creating binding legal principle. Hence the civil law culture is more rational, orderly, authoritative and paternalistic.

Common law has a culture of judicial inventiveness and even flexibility. Enunciation of principle is not forever paramount but indeed a continuing flow of cases and statutes add to the ebb and flow of the law, whereby 'case law represented the modern man's realisation of his own limitations.' Further differences include where a civilian lawyer speaks in terms of the law of nature while the common lawyer speaks to reason. It follows that the culture of these legal systems has been moulded by perceptions of justice and the means available to attain it.

== Common law comparisons ==
Legal culture can differ between countries despite their conformity to a similar if not identical legal system. Both the United States and England possess common law systems of law and yet each country embodies a distinctive legal culture. This has been attributable by contrasting both the institutions within the legal system and characteristics of the profession (judges, barristers and solicitors).

According to Posner during 1996 there was about 15 times more American judges than English judges but only about 10 times more American lawyers than English lawyers. Posner suggests that English judges have more prestige than American judges and a related point is that the ratio of judges to lawyers is lower in England than the United States. The consequence of this is that the English common law system, as opposed to the American legal system, displays a legal culture of greater prestige and elitism not only in the judiciary but also those who are candidates for the judiciary.

In England, and other Commonwealth jurisdictions, barristers are apt candidates for judicial nomination. The reasons for this stem from the common law systems which have a culture to encourage, harness and capture high quality intellect and experience within a concentrated portion of non-judicial officers of the legal profession known as barristers (which includes and accounts for their subsequent appointments to higher ranking King's Counsel and Senior Counsel).

Barristers are engaged upon a solicitor's brief instead of direct engagement with the client. This insulation avoids lay persons being taken advantage of by unscrupulous lawyers which is evidently "a big problem in the United States, where incompetent lawyers, and known to be such both by judges and by other lawyers, often wow naïve clients."

The cost of pursuing litigation influences the culture of each legal system in terms of what society perceives as the net benefit gained from the court and the profession. To litigate similar cases in England and the United States would cost approximately the same; however English courts are not as generous as their American counterparts in awarding damages, especially punitive damages. Therefore the net expected benefit of litigation being greater in the United States encourages a legal culture that is more litigious in nature than England.

National character is inherent in the legal institutions of the courts and parliament, their formation and their output in terms of legislation or judgments. For example it has been said that many factors have contributed to the litigiousness of the United States, including: the rights afforded to the people, a written constitution, immigrant origins of its population, racial and ethnic heterogeneity and the wealth and spoils of its population. To this end national character and history influence current legal culture.

== Chinese legal culture ==
The legal culture of People's Republic of China, as well as its social and economic culture, continues to undergo dramatic change since the People's Republic of China's reforms of 1978. Transformation has occurred by legal modernisation whereby a rule of law has been suggested to replace the rule of man. The latter is a characteristic of the traditional rural Chinese society where unwritten rules, personal relationships and trust govern citizens' legal relationships; analogous to gemeinschaft. In the modern society of China, institutional, customary and legal reform (a rule of law that embodies universal rules uniformly enforced by a centralised and bureaucratic state) is necessary to govern legal relations; analogous to gesellschaft.

Direct transplants of western legal systems or culture may not provide an adequate rule of law where the life of ordinary Chinese may be marginalised in favour of legal elite who use legal instruments for self-promotion. Furthermore, implanting western legal norms disregards the local culture and relations; thus potentially destroying significant cultural bonds and relationships in the rural community. The traditional rural Chinese legal culture which is premised on personal and informal relations faces erosion unless legal pluralism is promoted.

A top down approach in analysing the legal culture of China suggests that both under Deng Xiaoping and Jiang Zemin, China is "a country under rule by law, not rule of law." Evidence comes from post Mao-China, where law is seen as necessary for institutionalising and generalising ad hoc policies for economic reform and as maintaining party leadership.

Further problems with the Chinese legal culture include a piecemeal approach to law making with an imbalance between law and policy; denials of private law; neglect towards human rights and individual liberties; and poor enforcement of laws. According to Chen, the consensus in China among scholars is that the lack of democracy and rule of law are interdependent concepts whereby "the rule of law is legitimate only if it is the product of democratic government." This is where one could look at Taiwan (known officially as the Republic of China) which is a unitary semi-presidential constitutional republic. Taiwan is characterized as a representative democracy. Despite its democratic values underpinned by a constitution based on the German civil law it does not receive wide recognition as a state separate from the People's Republic of China.

What is evident with the People's Republic of China experience is that legal culture is susceptible to change in pursuance to socio-economic and political forces. While such a change could be beneficial for portions of the society and international relations, traditional and established cultural methods face extinction.

== See also ==
- Culture of honor vs. culture of law
- Incarceration in the United States
- Indigenous law
- Legal anthropology
- Prison–industrial complex
- Sociology of law
- Western law
- Byzantine law
