= Journal of Legal Pluralism and Unofficial Law =

- Discipline: Law
- Language: English
- Edited by: Dik Roth

Publication details
- Former name(s): African Law Studies
- History: 1969-present
- Publisher: Taylor & Francis
- Frequency: Triannually
- Open access: Delayed, after 2 years

Standard abbreviations
- ISO 4: J. Leg. Plur. Unoff. Law

Indexing
- ISSN: 0732-9113 (print); 2305-9931 (web)
- LCCN: 82643292
- OCLC no.: 746964109

Links
- Journal homepage; Online access; Online archive

The Journal of Legal Pluralism and Unofficial Law (formerly African Law Studies) is a triannual peer-reviewed academic journal focusing on all aspects of legal pluralism and unofficial law. It was established in 1969 and is the official publication of the Commission on Legal Pluralism. The journal is published by Taylor & Francis. The editor-in-chief is Dik Roth (Wageningen University). Past editors-in-chief include Melanie Wiber (University of New Brunswick) and Gordon Woodman (University of Birmingham).
