= Chthonic law =

Legal tradition centered on the sacred character of the cosmos

Chthonic law is a legal tradition centered on the sacred character of the cosmos. According to Professor H. Patrick Glenn, the Chthonic legal tradition emerged through experience, orality and memory, is the "oldest of all traditions" and can be understood as the law of a culture or tribe. Glenn refers to the laws of indigenous people as he believes these people "are in close harmony to earth". At a broader level it is used with reference to any law which is a part of the custom or tradition of the people and in this regard is distinguishable from the traditional definition of law. Some authors believe that modern law has evolved from a scientific comparison of different Chthonic legal traditions. It is studied as a part of pluralism of law.

== The nature of chthonic law ==
Although chthonic law appears susceptible to confusion, any potential confusion is removed by preserving what is important to the law over thousands of years, based on cultural norms and mores. Transmission of the law takes place with oral tradition and memory over the ages. It has a communal basis and aims to promote consensus. When dissent arises, new rules and traditions are generated.

Although chthonic law does not lend itself to complexity, complex institutions such as councils of elders are present and serve as the highest authority under the chthonic legal system.

Dispute resolution is believed to be neither confusing nor alienating. The importance of an individual in this law depends on his or her knowledge of traditions and culture and hence elders are valued due to their enhanced level of wisdom. Land for example, is a communal property, and hence its ownership and usage was determined at the level of community, avoiding any alienation.

Ultimately chthonic law is tied to tradition and hence cannot be understood without understanding the traditions and culture of the people. By some accounts, women—in their capacity as elders—played a more important role in Chthonic laws.

== Criticisms ==
According to Chippewa lawyer Gregory Gagnon, "a major criticism of Chtonic Law theory is that it tends to describe a fictionnalized version of society. Examples of American Indian violence, use of punishment, and private property law counter the idyllic construction of Chthonic law."

== Examples ==
- The legal system of Indonesia and Malaysia
- The culture of Inuit and Northern Scandinavia
- Adat law of Middle East
- Talmudic law in Rabbinic Judaism

== See also ==
- Common law
- Indigenous law
- Natural law
- Natural order
- Norm (social)
- H. Patrick Glenn—the most preeminent researcher in this field of law
