= Thomas Crabtree =

Thomas Crabtree may refer to:

- Tom Crabtree (Thomas Lewis Crabtree), American football player
- Thomas Crabtree (judge) (born 1955), Canadian judge
- Thomas Crabtree Three-Decker, a house in Massachusetts
