= Western law =

Legal traditions of Western culture

Western law comprises the laws, jurisprudence, legal traditions, systems, norms, and culture of Western civilization and Western countries, primarily with roots in Roman law, Germanic law, Biblical and Mosaic Law, and canon law, but encompassing many other subtypes and influences throughout Western history. As Western culture shares Greco-Roman Classical, Christian, Medieval, and Renaissance cultural influences, so do its legal systems. Primary sub-categories include biblical law, Mosaic law, canon law, Ancient Greek law, Roman law, Germanic law (Including Continental Germanic, Anglo-Saxon, and Old Norse laws, as well as some additional kinds), Celtic law, Byzantine law, feudal law, common law, civil law, Rus' Law, and socialist law, among several others, all of which have been influential upon the West itself, upon one another, and upon the entire world (particularly through imperialism, colonialism, the Pax Americana, and the Cold War via Westernization, Europeanization, Americanization, Russification, Christianization, and Sovietization) to varying degrees. They were moderately influenced in their initial development by the legal systems, such as cuneiform law, of the Ancient Near East, and share deep biblical inheritance with Jewish law.

== History ==
The rediscovery of the Corpus Iuris Civilis (known by synecdoche as the Code of Justinian), a compilation and codification of Roman law, in the early 10th century rekindled a passion in Europe for the discipline of law, initially shared across many of the re-forming boundaries between Eastern and Western Europe (an internal division not to be confused with the broader East–West dichotomy). Eventually, it was only in the Roman Catholic, Latin, or Frankish west that Roman law became the foundation of all legal concepts and systems. Its influence can be traced to this day in all Western legal systems, although differing in kind and degree between the common (Anglophone) and the civil (continental European and Latin American) legal traditions.

The study of canon law, the legal system of the Catholic Church, fused with that of Roman law to form the basis for the refounding of Western legal scholarship, epitomized by the phrase "Ecclesia vivit lege Romana" ("The Church lives by Roman law"). It was the first modern Western legal system and is the oldest continuously functioning legal system in the West. Its principles of civil rights, equality before the law, equality of women, procedural justice, and democracy as the ideal form of society formed the basis of modern Western culture.

== Western legal culture ==
Western culture, equivalent to Western civilization, refers to the culture of the Western world, which originally encompassed the Greco-Roman World, the Barbarian European peoples, and Christian European civilization prior to the Colonial period, and which now includes Latin America, the Anglosphere, and Russia as well, and as a term is used very broadly to refer to the externally cohesive but internally diverse heritage of social norms, ethical values, traditional customs, belief systems, political systems, artifacts, and technologies that have some origin or association with Christianity, Classical Antiquity, Europe, and former European colonies which were especially strongly influenced by Europeans themselves.

Western legal culture is unified in the systematic reliance on legal constructs. Such constructs include corporations, contracts, estates, rights and powers to name a few. These concepts are nonexistent in many non-Western traditional legal systems and have been controversially argued, on the basis of the Sapir-Whorf Hypothesis, to be absent from such cultures due to being incapable of expression in their languages.

As a general proposition, the concept of legal culture depends on language and symbols and any attempt to analyse non western legal systems in terms of categories of modern western law can result in distortion attributable to differences in language. So while legal constructs are unique to classical Roman, modern civil and common law cultures, legal concepts or primitive and archaic law get their meaning from sensed experience based on facts as opposed to theory or abstract. Legal culture therefore in the former group is influenced by academics, learned members of the profession and historically, philosophers. The latter group's culture is harnessed by beliefs, values and religion at a foundation level.

== See also ==
=== Related Topics ===
- List of national legal systems
- History of Western civilization
- History of Western civilization before AD 500
- Legal norms
- Legal tradition
- Legal system
- Western world
- Western culture
- Law
- Legal history
- Jurisprudence
- Legal culture
- List of ancient legal codes

=== Native Legal Traditions ===
- Biblical law
- Mosaic law
- Canon law
- Roman law
- Ancient Greek law
- Byzantine law
- Germanic law
- Anglo-Saxon law
- Medieval Scandinavian law
- Celtic law
- Medieval law
- Common law
- Civil law
- Kievan Rus' law
- Socialist law

=== Foreign Legal Influences and Related Legal Traditions ===
- Cuneiform law
- Halakha
