= Thomas Crabtree (judge) =

Canadian judge

- Born: Thomas J. Crabtree; 1955 (age 70–71); London, England
- Education: University of Victoria
- Occupation: Jurist
- Years active: 1999 - present
- Spouse: Brenda Crabtree
- Children: 2

Justice of the Supreme Court of British Columbia
- Incumbent
- Assumed office 2018
- Preceded by: B.M. Joyce

Chief Judicial Officer of the National Judicial Institute
- Incumbent
- Assumed office 2018
- Preceded by: C. Adèle Kent

Chief Judge of the Provincial Court of British Columbia
- In office 2010–2018
- Preceded by: James J. Threlfall
- Succeeded by: Melissa Gillespie

Thomas J. Crabtree is a Justice of the Supreme Court of British Columbia and the Chief Judicial Officer of the National Judicial Institute. Prior to his appointment to the Supreme Court in 2018, he served as the Chief Judge of the Provincial Court of British Columbia from 2010 to 2018. After finishing law school he practised criminal and civil litigation in Chilliwack until his appointment as a Provincial Court judge in 1999.

Crabtree was born in London, England and raised in British Columbia, Canada. He earned his Bachelor of Arts degree from the University of British Columbia, and his LL.B. from the University of Victoria in 1983.
