= University of Victoria Faculty of Law =

Law school in Victoria, British Columbia

- Motto: "Let there be light" & "A multitude of the wise is the health of the world"
- Established: 1975; 51 years ago
- School type: Public
- Parent endowment: $140.7 million
- Dean: Freya Kodar
- Location: Victoria, British Columbia, Canada; 48.4650°N 123.3164°W
- Enrolment: 375
- Faculty: 62
- Website: www.law.uvic.ca

The University of Victoria Faculty of Law, commonly referred to as UVic Law, is a law school at the University of Victoria in Victoria, British Columbia, Canada. The school grants JD, JID, LLM, and PhD degrees in law.

The law school’s alumni include one Justice of the Supreme Court of Canada, two Attorneys General of British Columbia, two federal Cabinet ministers, the 51st Mayor of Victoria, and the first woman to serve as permanent Leader of the Opposition in Nova Scotia. The current dean of UVic Law is Freya Kodar.

UVic Law has around 375 students in its JD and JD/JID programs. With about 125 first-year seats and approximately 1,350 applicants annually, the school has an acceptance rate of around 9%.

== Reputation ==
University rankings

World rankings

Canadian rankings

The school was consistently ranked as one of the top law schools in Canada by Canadian Lawyer Magazine's Report Card on Canadian Law Schools before the magazine reformed the report card to cease ranking schools, being ranked #1 in Canada for the years 2001, 2002, 2003, and 2005. Maclean's 2013 ranking of Canadian common law schools placed the school seventh out of 16.

== Admission and student body ==
About 105 students are enrolled each year. The LSAT is required for admission to the school. 55% of the students are women, and 29% are visible minorities.

Additionally, the UVic Law School was also behind the first run of the Akitsiraq Law School, the only law school program to operate in Nunavut. The program involved University of Victoria professors spending rotating semesters in Iqaluit to teach a full curriculum of law school classes. The first run of the program graduated 11 Inuit lawyers in 2005, significantly increasing the number of lawyers in Nunavut.

== Specialties ==
The Environmental Law Centre, created in 1995, provides legal information and assistance to local, provincial and national environmental groups including the Sierra Legal Defence Fund, the David Suzuki Foundation, the West Coast Environmental Law and Probe International. On account of its focus on environmental law and sustainability issues, UVic Law was ranked by Corporate Knights magazine as the second-best law school in Canada in terms of its integration of environmental and social issues into the law school experience.

UVic Law has a significant focus on Indigenous law programming and attracting Indigenous students. There is an endowed Professorship in Aboriginal Justice and Governance at the law school as well as a National Chair in Aboriginal Economic Development that the law school shares with the business school. There is a special admission category for Aboriginal students. At the beginning of every year, students are invited to a four-day event called Aboriginal Cultural Awareness Camp where students spend time at a nearby reserve learning about that particular aboriginal community as well as broader legal issues involving aboriginal persons in Canada.

== Law Co-op Program ==
The University of Victoria Faculty of Law is the only common law school in Canada to offer a co-op education program. The program allows students to alternate between terms on work placements and scholastic terms after completing their first year. Students in the co-op program have two required work terms; students are encouraged to have one placement in each of a private firm, government, and a public interest organization or administrative tribunal. Students are also encouraged to take work placements outside of British Columbia and a number of regular placements are available in places including France, Thailand, Mongolia, Canada's north, and Africa. Although every student who applies to the co-op program has been offered admission in recent years, there is a lottery for who gets to be admitted in time for the summer after first year.

== JD/JID Program ==
Following a multi-year effort spearheaded by John Borrows and Val Napoleon, the Faculty became the first law school in Canada to offer a program which integrates a study of the Canadian common law and of indigenous legal traditions. The Joint Juris Doctor and Juris Indigenarum Doctor (JD/JID) program admitted its first cohort in the fall of 2018.

== The Law Centre Clinical Program ==
The University of Victoria Faculty of Law runs a unique clinical program, called The Law Centre. This program allows students to put their legal skills to work by providing a wide range of legal services to low-income persons in the Victoria area. Unlike most clinics at Canadian law schools, students at The Law Centre are required to obtain temporary articles from the Law Society, and can thus provide full representation for a number of matters. Law Centre students regularly appear in court for criminal sentencing hearings, family matters, criminal and civil trials, and so on. They also regularly appear before administrative tribunals such as the Human Rights Tribunal.

== Combined Degrees ==
The following combined degree programs are offered:

- JD/M.B.A. - Master of Business Administration offered in conjunction with the UVic Business School
- JD/M.P.A. - Master of Public Administration offered in conjunction with the UVic School of Public Administration
- JD/JID Program - Joint Degree Program in Canadian Common Law and Indigenous Legal Orders
- JD/B.C.L. - Joint Common Law/Civil Law Degree Program offered in conjunction with a Canadian Civil Law Degree-granting institution

== Student organizations ==
Students manage a range of organizations and activities at the Faculty of Law. Activities include free legal clinics such as the on-site Legal Information Clinic, the Business Law Clinic, the Environmental Law Clinic, and the Law Centre located in downtown Victoria, mooting, Appeal: The Law Journal of the University of Victoria, and interest oriented clubs. The umbrella organization for JD students at the Faculty of Law is the Law Students' Society. The student society acts as a student government, providing funding to student organizations and advocating on behalf of students to the faculty and administration.
