= Scandinavian law =

Law of five Nordic countries

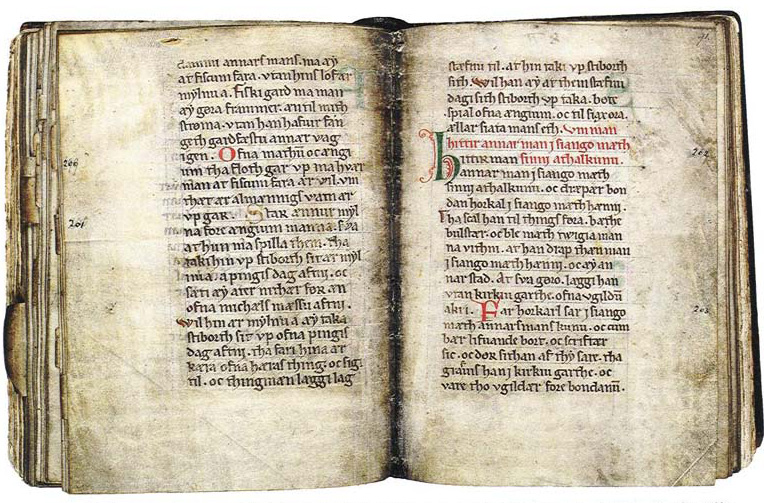
Oldest known vernacular manuscript (c. 1250) in Scanian/Danish with the Scanian Law and the Scanian Ecclesiastical Law.

Scandinavian law, also known as Nordic law, is the law of the five Nordic countries, namely Denmark, Finland, Iceland, Norway and Sweden. It is generally regarded as a subgroup of civil law or as an individual legal body in itself. Prior to the 19th century, the European countries were independent in their administering and legality. However, in 1872, the Nordic countries organised legislative cooperation. Especially in areas of contracts and commerce, as well as those concerned with family, nationality and extradition, the five states have obtained uniform legislation.

== Historical development ==
Prior to the establishment of Scandinavian states in the 9th century, the numerous regions were independent in their administration and legal matters. Initially, the legal system had no written laws; rather, it consisted of customary law that was developed and reformed by the citizens themselves at meetings known as "things". Customary laws were recorded in writing between the 11th and 13th centuries. These include, the Gulathing's law (11th century, Norwegian); the law of Jutland (1241, Danish); and the laws of Uppland (1296, Swedish) and Götaland (13th century, Swedish).

The early laws were not formatted as they are in modern-day legal systems, rather they used codes. These included private law, namely criminal law, family law, succession, property law, contract law, constitutional and administrative law. Laws relating to the Church were usually treated separate to laws of the states and people. The codes represented customary laws and usually, foreign influences were neglected. Mutual with Germanic laws, the provincial laws abided by externalities and thus, were more advanced. King Magnus' Swedish code (1350) abolished the concepts of vengeance, stating that the king's officials should be the necessary authorities in administering criminal proceedings and hold punishment for those who went against the law. Further, presumably by influence of the Christian religion, the legal system was introduced for the benefit of peasants and the helpless class.

Although in 1380 Norway and Denmark were ruled by a common king – Olav IV, the two states maintained laws separate to one another. Before the acquisition by Frederick III in 1660, supplementary laws were introduced. During the rule of Christian V, a thorough process of codification took place, with the earlier laws being replaced by Christian V's Danish Law (1683) and Norwegian Law (1687). These new laws were predominantly based on the existing laws of the two countries with influences of Germanic and Roman laws being fairly minor. Similar to the earlier laws, these new laws consisted of both public and private law. At the time of their drafting, these codes read well and reflected individual human rights and the ideologies of equality. Further, in comparison to the laws of other European countries, the criminal law provisions were fair, humane and reflected individual rights.

In Sweden, the laws issued by King Christopher in 1442 were affirmed by Charles IX in 1608. However, following the Danish-Norwegian reforms, a royal commission was assembled to draft a modern new code. The result being, ´the "Law of 1734", assented by Frederick I. Held by Sweden since the 13th century, Finland followed the Swedish law of 1734, which was translated in Finnish as "Law of the Realm of Finland".

== Modern Scandinavian law ==
In most of the five Nordic States, the old codes have developed by parliamentary statutes. However, in Sweden, while the law of 1734 is still regarded as a formal framework, the exact text in the law of 1734 is irrelevant in all juridical perspectives as the laws have all been superseded or replaced by newer laws or if nothing else just been rewritten to actually be readable today. In the other countries, codes are no longer of importance, rather, comprehensive codification of public and private law holds importance.

While the historic codes still hold significance in Scandinavia today, the developments in modern Scandinavia has led to growth in Scandinavian civil law by way of statutes. Although the five Nordic countries follow similar legal theories, they have developed their own legal standards. Nonetheless, the countries follow an agreement to cooperate on legislative matters.

Since 1872 when the agreement was entered into, the organised legislative cooperation in Scandinavian law has progressively increased in significance. As such, the Nordic states have achieved uniform legislation, in fields of contracts, commerce, family, nation and extradition.

Scandinavian legal systems adopted their civil law conceptions through the influence of law schools and commercial and corporations law are similar to European laws. Further, modern social welfare and human rights legislation has strong connections with the international laws. Scandinavian law, with a foundation of its customary laws, is pliable and less authoritarian than other European legal systems as it is relatively less restrictive.

== Sources of Law ==
All five of the Nordic states have their own respective Constitutions upon which their legislative framework is based. Whilst these Constitutions are all separate in nature, due to the legal cooperation between the Scandinavian states, the Constitutions are similar in their aims and contribute to the laws holistically.

=== Norwegian law ===
Norway's legal system is a civil law system. Therefore, legislation is the predominant source of law, however not the sole one. According to legal scholar and author Torstein Eckhoff, there are seven sources of Norwegian law, including:

1. Legislation;
2. Legislative history;
3. Case law;
4. Administrative practice;
5. Customary law;
6. Legal literature; and
7. Equity

Due to the Nordic legal cooperation, this list is not exhaustive. Laws are informed and correspond to the other Scandinavian states. The three distinctive sections of Norwegian law are the Constitution, then ordinary statutes and followed by the regulations derived from statutes

Norway adopted its Constitution in 1814 and holds the position of the second oldest hand-written Constitution in the world which is still in use. The Constitution consists of a set of Norwegian laws based upon the legal principles of sovereignty, the separation and division of powers and universal human rights.

The Constitution forms three distinctive branches of government, including:

1. Legislative power vested in the Storting;
2. Executive power vested in the King in Council, Regjeringen; and
3. Judicial power vested in the Supreme Court, the subsidiary courts and in the Court of Impeachment.

Article 49 and 75 of the Constitution highlight the principles of sovereignty whereby it states that the people of Norway issue laws, make decisions regarding the states' funds, impose taxes and supervise authorities, including the Government, by way of the Storting.

Stated within Article 3 of the Constitution, the executive power is held by the King, or the Queen. However, according to Article 27, Royal laws are adopted by the King in Council. Such laws are validated by the Prime Minister, the political leadership upon which the constitutional and senatorial responsibility is bestowed.

Published by the Faculty of Law in Oslo and Fagbokforlaget, Norges lover is Norway's most comprehensive code of law. It consists of one volume published annually and used by law students, legal professional and officers of the court. The code contains the Constitution, legislation in force, adopted legislation yet to take effect and also pre-1814 legislation which is still valid and in force.

As the Storting only passes entirely new Acts and abolishes the old Acts, amendments to legislation are integrated in the existing statutes. The Norges Lover follows a chronological order by date of enactment, excluding the Constitution, which is placed at the front of the code.

=== Swedish law ===
Swedish law is a mixture of common and civil law system manifested on statutory laws.

Sweden's Constitution consists of the four "fundamental laws", consisting of:

1. The Instrument of Government (1974);
2. The Act of Succession (1810);
3. The Freedom of the Press Act (1949); and
4. The Fundamental Law on Freedom of Expression (1991)

Further to the above, there is also Riksdagordningen (2014) which translates to the Parliament Act (2014), however this is not classified as a law fundamental to the state.

The fundamental laws take precedence over all other laws and the courts have an obligation to judicially review new laws. The written Constitution regulates the Riksdag – the Swedish Parliament, the appointing of Government officials and it sets out the key ways in which Sweden's authorities shall function.

The Swedish Code of Statutes is Sweden's official compilation of all laws enacted by the Riksdag and regulations issued by the Government.

This Code is enacted into statutory law, however it forms its own disjointed legal code containing all of the laws passed by the Government, including civil and criminal law, procedure, regulations, legal information and all other legal articles pertinent to Sweden. Although Sweden follows a civil law system, this Code of Statutes combines both statutory and civil law. The Code is amended frequently and amendments are integrated to the existing statutes. Similar to Norway, Sweden's Constitution is placed at the front of its Code of Statutes.

=== Finnish law ===
Finnish laws and legal traditions are influenced by Swedish law and holistically also the Scandinavian and German legal families. Based on civil law tradition, the law of Finland consists mostly of statutory law enacted by the Parliament of Finland. Finland's Constitution takes supreme authority and sets out the procedures and guidelines for the application of legislation. Similar to other civil law systems, judicial decisions are generally not authoritative in nature and there is often not many judge-made laws. Further, Supreme Court decisions may be cited, however they are not actually binding.

Being a member of the European Union, Finland enacts many European Union laws and implements the European Union directives in its national laws.

Finland's current Constitution came into force in 2000 and aims to regulate legislation and the manner in which government power is exercised. It specifies the primary rules, values and principles of the Finnish government and democracy. Furthermore, it details the significance of the relationship between the citizen and the government. In relation to the government, the Constitution governs the use of government power, the government organisation and the authorities and organs of the government.

=== Danish law ===
The Danish legal system is a combination of public and civil law. This mix of law suggests that Danish law focuses on societal interests and also that the organs of the state are vested with greater authority than the courts in applying legal frameworks.

The legal system primarily consists of statutory regulation, principles and laws. Similar to the other Nordic states, although the courts have authority to create laws, the statutory law is supplemented by customary law and case law. Alike all other Scandinavian countries, the Constitution of Denmark is at the top of the legal hierarchy.

Adopted in 1849, the principal aim of Denmark's Constitution was to abolish the absolute monarchy by limiting the King's power and introduce a system of democracy. It establishes the framework for governance by way of structure, procedure, power and the duties bestowed on the Danish Parliament.

The Danish Parliament known is not permitted to make laws which may invalidate or contradict the Constitutional Act. Although Denmark does not have a court to try constitutional matters, laws can be declared unconstitutional and void by the judgment of the Supreme Court of Denmark.

=== Icelandic law ===
Iceland has a civil law system and therefore its main sources of law include the Constitution, statutory legislation and regulatory statutes. Complementing sources include precedent and customary laws followed by Scandinavia.

The most recent Constitution of Iceland is of 1999. It is regarded as the supreme law of Iceland and highlights the leadership structures of the country and preserves the human rights of its citizens.

Apart from the Constitution from which it is influenced and regulated, legislation in Iceland takes primacy as a source of law. The increasing propensity of social, economic and political trends has resulted in a greater significance of laws by way of new general acts targeting niche sectors such as customs, respect of children, banking, communication and corporations' laws.

== Academic views on Scandinavian law ==
The Stockholm Institute for Scandinavian Law (SISL) proclaims that as all of the Nordic states follow the civil law system, Scandinavian law as a whole should be classified as civil law as opposed to common law. Due to the fact that common law has taken little precedence in the development of law in the Nordic countries and additionally that all legal concepts presently adopted in Scandinavian law have been derived from the civil Germanic law, the SISL views Scandinavian law as a civil law system.
