= Val Napoleon =

Val Napoleon is a Canadian legal scholar and jurist. She is a professor of law and the Law Foundation Chair of Indigenous Justice and Governance at the University of Victoria. She is known as a leading authority on Canadian Indigenous law and legal pluralism. Her work has been influential on the findings of three major national commissions of inquiry: the Truth and Reconciliation Commission of Canada, the National Inquiry into Missing and Murdered Indigenous Women and Girls, and Quebec's Commission d'enquête sur les relations entre les Autochtones et certains services publics au Québec. She is Cree from Saulteau First Nations in northeastern British Columbia.

== Honors and awards ==
- 2026 Member of the Royal Society of Canada Academy of Social Sciences
- 2026 Pierre Elliott Trudeau Foundation Fellow
- 2025 King Charles III Coronation Medal
- 2024 Royal Society of Canada Yvan Allair Medal
- 2021 Indspire Award (National) for Law and Justice
- 2019 Lexpert Zenith Award, National Change Agent in Law
- 2010 University of Victoria’s Governor General’s Gold Medal for Outstanding Dissertation

== Selected books ==
- Val Napoleon, Emily Snyder, Rebecca Johnson, and Debra McKenzie, eds. Ravens Talking: Indigenous Feminist Studies (University of Toronto Press, 2025).
- Val Napoleon, Rebecca Johnson, Richard Overstall, and Debra McKenzie, Indigenous Intellectual Property: An Interrupted Intergenerational Conversation (University of Toronto Press, 2024).
- Angela Cameron, Sari Graben, and Val Napoleon, eds., Creating Indigenous Property (University of Toronto Press, 2020).
- Catherine Bell and Val Napoleon, eds., First Nations Cultural Heritage and Law: Case Studies, Voices and Perspectives, (Vancouver: UBC Press, 2008).
