= Drumkeeper =

A Drumkeeper is a common name for someone in an Indigenous community who has inherited a traditional sacred drum and the right to play it in ceremony, or been instructed by their Elders in how to make and play one in order to fulfill this role. These ceremonial drums can include water drums, hand drums, and larger drums used during ceremonies such as Sun Dances and sweatlodges.

In Anishinaabe ceremonial communities, the water drum may be passed down from one generation to the next. Only a few elders keep these drums, and they are only used for important ceremonies. In Osage culture, a drumkeeper may be chosen every few years. This is traditionally done during the four-day I'N-Lon-Schka ceremonial dance in June.
