= Legal norm =

Binding rule that sovereign powers enforce

A legal norm is a binding rule or principle, or norm, that organizations of sovereign power promulgate and enforce in order to regulate social relations. Legal norms determine the rights and duties of individuals who are the subjects of legal relations within the governing jurisdiction at a given point in time. Some theorists, such as Stephen Krasner, define norms as “standards of behavior defined in terms of rights and obligations.” Competent state authorities issue and publish basic aspects of legal norms through a collection of laws that individuals under that government must abide by, which is further guaranteed by state coercion. There are two categories of legal norms: normativity, which regulates the conduct of people, and generality, which is binding on an indefinite number of people and cases. Diplomatic and legislative immunity refers to instances where legal norms are constructed to be targeted towards a minority and are specifically only binding on them, such as soldiers and public officials.

In a legal sense, retroactivity refers to a law that impairs or invalidates the vested rights of an individual acquired under existing laws by creating new obligations to considerations that have been pre-established. Legal norms can either classify under true retroactivity, where norms influence the legal relations that have existed before its effect, or pseudo retroactivity, referring to how the validity of old legal relations can be influenced by derogated norms.

Legal norms become validated from the moment they are published as part of legal order and take effect from the moment it binds the subjects of the law. The Latin phrase "vacatio legis" refers to the period of time between a legal norm's validity and effect. As the validity of a legal norm is limited from the moment of its adoption by legal institutions, a lapse of time can cause its termination. Legal norms can either be terminated by explicit derogation by the competent state authority, or through automatic derogation whereby the authoritative organisation adopts a new normative act that regulates the same relations, effectively replacing the old one.

== Planning theory ==
Scott Shapiro's Planning Theory of Law is built upon two concepts: the nature of legal institutions and the nature of legal norms. The thesis of the Planning Theory argues how legal norms function as shared plans that legal institutions implement in order to exercise social control and governance, regardless of the moral merits of those norms and institutions.

Legal institutions can govern in two main ways. Firstly, they can be classified as planning organisations which create, apply and enforce social plans, thus suggesting how many legal norms are simply plans. However, planning institutions may also apply and enforce legal norms that were not created during the process of planning but still nonetheless allow organisations to govern. An example of this would be a customary norm, which have been shaped and informed by cultural values over prolonged periods of time. Shapiro refers to these legal norms as "plan-like norms", that have been "sustained by human action" and "economise on deliberation costs, compensate for cognitive incapacities, and organise behaviour between participants". Such jurisprudential concepts can then be positioned and subsequently viewed through the context of modern legal systems. A shared master plan consisting of the fundamental rules that underpin legal systems allows the delegation of rights, powers and responsibilities for different officials. Above this, sub-plans of the master plan are established, which are either in the form of plans or plan-like norms that are administered by the executive government, for example the particular norms of criminal law that prohibit murder or laws specifying the processes of tax collection. Therefore, the total set of laws in a jurisdiction at a given time consists in the totality of plans and plan-like norms enforced by officials, regardless of any facts about moral merit.

== Normative legal theory ==
Whilst fact-based positive legal theory explains the causes and effects of the law's application, normative legal theory informs what the law ought to be by navigating the values and reasons that underpin legal actions, the adoption of legislation and judge-made law. Legal theorists use the word "normative" in its general sense that encompasses legal norms, social norms and moral norms. Normative legal theories are highly evaluative and are entwined with moral and political theories. An example that highlights the differences between positive legal theory and normative legal theory is presented through a comparison of their approaches to tort law. Whilst positive theory seeks to explain what causal forces have produced the existing tort principles, normative theory determines what rules of tort liability would be the most justifiable.

Normative legal theory uses judgments to conclude the most appropriate rule to be applied in legal reasoning and is influenced by moral or political theories. The general normative theories of deontology, utilitarianism and virtue ethics are three general normative theories that significantly inform normative legal theory:

According to Stephen D. Krasner, norms are "standards of behavior defined in terms of rights and obligations."

=== Deontology ===
A conceptual rival against utilitarianism, deontological moral theories explore the concept of duty with its correlative notions of rights and permission. An individual can determine the "rightness" of their action by considering whether it is required, prohibited or allowed by a moral rule. Applying this concept within normative legal theory to criminal law, it is reflected when an action cannot be crime unless it violates a moral duty and the retributive theories of punishment.

=== Utilitarianism ===
Utilitarianism is a form of consequentialism whereby decisions are made by predicting the outcome that determines the moral worth of an action. It assumes that the system of legal rules as opposed to individual moral rules provide the relevant scope of a decision.

=== Virtue ethics ===
Placing this theory into a legal context, an action is considered right when an individual, being a virtuous moral agent performs a deed that displays the essences of human excellences. In applying virtuous legal norms, a virtue-centred theory of judging displays the characteristics of judicial temperance, courage, temperament, intelligence, wisdom and justice. These excellences may translate into a concern with equity in virtue jurisprudence.

== Legal philosophers ==
Whilst both legal theorists Kelsen and Hart believe that legal normativity cannot be reduced to mere factuality or moral normativity, their approaches to interpretations of the concept itself differ. A comparison of their respective contributions to legal normativity will be presented.

=== Kelsen's "General Theory of Norms" ===
Kelsen explores factors that contribute to the normative status of legal rules. He believes that although all normative legal systems have similar structures, each particular system displays idiosyncrasies, thus making law conceptually distinct from morality (Moore, 1978). Kelsen puts forth the argument that the Basic Norm is presupposed when an individual chooses to interpret the actions of authoritative officials in a normative way.

In his book Pure Theory of Law, Hans Kelsen aims to provide a holistic definition of law by embodying a comprehensive analysis of legal normativity and systematic structures. The Pure Theory champions legal positivism, which draws a clear distinction between the factual "is" and "what ought to be". Kelsen identifies law as both a unique type of social phenomenon that is differentiated from the rest by its specific mode of coercion, thus equating it with a system of norms. Yet, he also propounds the importance to distinguish between law in a factual sense and in the normative sense, associating his conviction about the normative character of law with a methodological dualism.

In its factual sense, Kelsen proposes that "law is an order of human behaviour". By drawing similarities between order, customs and etiquette, Kelsen suggests that the highly factual nature of law renders it an empirical phenomenon. Law is thus defined as both a social technique that coerces those who are subject to it into a system of rules of behaviour, while order constitutes an expansive system of norms that are derived from and validated by the same reason. An individual can thus determine whether a norm belongs to a normative system by ascertaining that it derives validity from the basic norm constituting the order. In its normative sense, laws are defined as "what ought to be done if something should be the case". Kelsen proposes that the normative statement, "it is a rule", can only have sense in the context of regular behaviour combined with a reflective, critical attitude by the population. In adopting this perspective, Kelsen ignores the specific "internal" dimension conditioning the meaning of normative utterances that are related to human values and morality.

=== Hart's "Sui Generis" ===
Hart rejects the notion that legal norms are formed by the classical "natural law model" and emphasises the contexts within which legal norms can have meaning. Hart's view navigates how contemporary societies may function better if a more deflationary understanding of the law is implemented, in lieu of restrictive moral standards.

Hart explains legal normativity by drawing references to social facts instead of Kelsen's approach that displays a methodological dualism. Unlike Kelsen's belief of the radical independence of law from morality leads him to defend that legal theory is fundamentally value-free, Hart does not champion such an extreme view and instead endorses soft positivism. He acknowledges that conformity with moral principles or substantive values can be incorporated into the criteria to determine the validity of legal rules. In explaining the normative force of law, Hart focuses on the context within which normative propositions exist, which has significant power in conditioning the meaning of these statements.

== Ontological model of legal norms ==
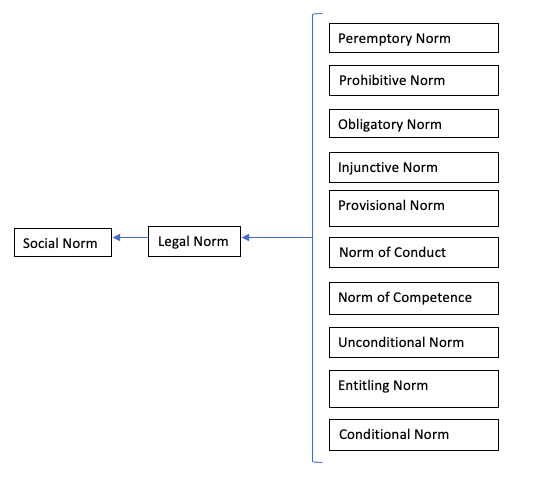
Ontological model of legal norms

Legal norms form the foundations of legal systems. Its structure can be presented using an ontological model that depicts how rules of conduct stipulated by legal norms influence the creation and use of legislation.

The ontological model of legal norms is an important tool as it facilitates efficient research that enables legal practitioners to make accountable decisions in court by applying legal norms. Legislation refers to laws that have been enacted by the government and made official by Parliament, thus formulating legal norms and their relations. An ontological model of legal norms can provide legal practitioners with explicit, visual representations of the processes through which legislation is created and administered by the executive government. The norms themselves can be modelled by logic, rules or ontologies to ease the process of retrieving legal information and semantic browsing.

Traditionally, legislation retrieval and browsing systems were based on text retrieval whereby a legal practitioner was required to enter specific words in order to acquire the section of legislation that was of interest. This was highly inefficient, as a legal rule may be fragmented whereby the property of the legal system a legal norm regulates in one social relation was contained in different legislation. The fragmentation of legal rules thus compounded the inefficiency of legislation usage and created high barriers for lawyers in regard to legal research, and especially for individuals who wished to retrieve legislative information but did not have a legal background. The ontological model posed an effective solution by categorising legislation based on the meaning of the legal norm it contains, enhancing both clarity and efficiency in research.

== See also ==
- Peremptory norm
- Customary international law
- Customary international humanitarian law
- Erga omnes
- Universal jurisdiction
