= Melanie Wiber =

Canadian anthropologist

Melanie Wiber is an economic and legal anthropologist and professor emerita of anthropology at University of New Brunswick. She joined the faculty of University of New Brunswick in 1987, becoming full professor in 1995. Wiber wrote Erect Men, Undulating Women: The Visual Imagery of Gender, ‘Race’ and Progress in Reconstructive Illustrations of Human Evolution (1997) and Politics, Property and Law in the Philippine Uplands (1993), both from Wilfrid Laurier University Press. She has been a visiting scholar at the Max Planck Institute for Social Anthropology.
