= Legal pluralism =

Multiple legal systems in one area

Legal pluralism is the existence of multiple legal systems within one society and/or geographical area.

== History ==
=== Church and State ===
The notion of "parallel sovereignty" between premodern States and the Catholic Church was an accepted situation in medieval and early modern Europe to such an extent that it was considered as the DNA of the occidental society. Even if the authorities were often in conflicts, the Church and State were habitually supportive for each other, so it's possible to have called it a "legal collaborative pluralism".

The theologians and jurists of the School of Salamanca like Domingo de Soto and Tomás de Mercado stimulated thus the interplay between canon and civil laws. The latest considered for example the confessor, judge of the conscience, as a veritable agent for the application of civil law.

=== Colonial societies ===
Plural legal systems are particularly prevalent in former colonies, where the law of a former colonial authority may exist alongside more traditional legal systems (customary law). In postcolonial societies a recognition of pluralism may be viewed as a roadblock to nation-building and development. Anthropologists view legal pluralism in the light of historical struggles over sovereignty, nationhood and legitimacy.

When the systems developed, the idea was that certain issues (such as commercial transactions) would be covered by colonial law, and other issues (family and marriage) would be covered by traditional law. Over time, those distinctions tended to break down, and individuals would choose to bring their legal claims under the system that they thought would offer them the best advantage.

== Current practice ==
Legal pluralism also occurs when different laws govern different groups within a country. For example, in India and Tanzania, there are special Islamic courts that address concerns in Muslim communities by following Islamic law principles. Secular courts deal with the issues of other communities.

Since modern Western legal systems can also be pluralistic, it is misleading to discuss legal pluralism only in relation to non-Western legal systems. Legal pluralism may even be found in settings that might initially appear legally homogenous. For example, there are dual ideologies of law within courthouses in the US, as the formal ideology of law as it is written exists alongside the informal ideology of law as it is used. The discussion on the internal and external plurality of legal systems is called sociology of law.

Sources of Islamic law include the Koran, Sunnah and Ijma, but most modern Western nation-states take the basis of their legal system from the Christian superpowers of old (Britain, France etc.). That is also why moral laws found in the Bible have actually been made full-fledged laws, with the initial grundnorm set far back in legal history, hence fulfilling the priority of both the positivists and the naturalists. The policy analyst Hamed Kazemzadeh writes, "In spite of the levelling off of many present differences under the impact of science, technology, and increased intercommunication, we cannot in any reasonably near future envisage any substantial lessening of the differences in our basic value systems, either philosophical or cultural".

Legal pluralism also exists to an extent in societies where the legal systems of the indigenous population have been given some recognition. In Australia, for example, the Mabo decision gave recognition to native title and thus elements of traditional Aboriginal law. Elements of traditional aboriginal criminal law have also been recognised, especially in sentencing. That has, in effect, set up two parallel sentencing systems. Another example is the Philippines whose customary ways of indigenous peoples in the Cordilleras are recognized by the Philippine government and in Kalinga, Bodong is the means used by the people to settle disputes: since it had been very effective for them, it is still widely practiced. Another example is the indigenous justice system of the Guaraní in Bolivia. The rondas campesinas in Peru are a special case, since they are more peasant than indigenous.

There is some concern that traditional legal systems and Muslim legal systems fail to promote women's rights. As a consequence, members of the Committee on the Elimination of Discrimination against Women (CEDAW) have called for a unification of legal systems within countries.

== In the Theory of Law ==
In legal anthropology and sociology, following research that noted that much social interaction is determined by rules outside of the law and that several such "legal orders" could exist in one country, John Griffiths, made a strong argument for the study of these social systems of rules and how they interact with the law itself, which came to be known as legal pluralism.

This concept of legal pluralism where the law is seen as one of many legal orders has been criticized. Roberts argued that the concept of law was intrinsically linked to the notion of the state so these legal orders should not be considered similar to law. On the other hand, Tamanaha and Griffiths have argued that law should only be studied as a particular form of social order together with other rules that govern social systems, abandoning the concept of law as something worth studying.

== See also ==
- Customary law
- Indigenous law
  - International customary law
- Journal of Legal Pluralism
- Legal dualism
- List of national legal systems
- Polycentric law
- Sociology of law
