= Akitsiraq Law School =

Legal education program in Nunavut, Canada

- Motto: Sui Generis
- Established: Akitsiraq I, 2001; Nunavut Law Program, 2017
- School type: Akitsiraq I: Bachelor of Laws (LL.B.) degree from the University of Victoria Faculty of Law; Nunavut Law Program: Juris Doctor (J.D.) degree from the University of Saskatchewan College of Law
- Dean: Anne Crawford (north) Daphne Gilbert (south)
- Location: Iqaluit, Nunavut, Canada
- Enrollment: 15 (2001 intake); 25 (2017 intake)
- Faculty: Akitsiraq I: University of Victoria Nunavut Law Program: University of Saskatchewan In partnership with Nunavut Arctic College with Nunatta Campus infrastructure
- Bar pass rate: The first Akitsiraq cohort graduated a class of 11 students from an initial 15 entrants. Of these 87% have passed the Bar.
- Website: https://www.arcticcollege.com/law www.akitsiraq.ca (defunct)

Nunavut Law Program, Akitsiraq Law Program, or Akitsiraq Law School is a special legal education program designed to increase the number of lawyers in Nunavut and the Canadian Arctic. Unlike traditional law schools, Akitsiraq has been offered only through limited intakes rather than as a permanent institution. The first cohort (Akitsiraq I) ran in partnership with the University of Victoria from 2001 to 2005, and a second intake (Nunavut Law Program) was launched in 2017 with the University of Saskatchewan. Graduates of the program receive the same law degree (Juris Doctor or Bachelor of Laws, depending on the degree offered at the time by the partner university) as students attending the partner institution. A proposal for a new cohort in partnership with the University of Ottawa was made for a planned 2011 start, but it did not proceed due to lack of funding from the territorial government.

The program was primarily delivered in Iqaluit in partnership with the Nunavut Arctic College.

The Law School has no permanent classrooms, employees or assets, and the admissions process has no formal education requirements. The Akitsiraq Law School focuses on the practical abilities of potential students based on life experience and work history. The program is strongly supported by legal professionals and by members of the Nunavut Judiciary through in-kind and volunteer services, developing effective programs and bringing legal resources from across Canada to teach each Akitsiraq cohort.

Akitsiraq programs have provided legal training to residents of Nunavut and the surrounding Arctic region, leading to professional and para-professional legal qualifications. The Akitsiraq Law School Society is a not-for-profit organization incorporated in Nunavut. Its board of directors and membership are drawn from the Nunavut judiciary, legal profession and supporting members of the public, along with nominees of supporting agencies.

The cohort-based, culture-enhancing, learning-in-Nunavut format of the Akitsiraq Law Program has frequently been promoted as a prototype for training in other professions including accounting and education administration.

== History ==
Despite the Nunavut Land Claims Agreement specifying that employment in the newly created Nunavut should be representative of the territory's demographics, people of Inuit descent were absent from the legal field. In the mid-1990s, six Inuit law students who had gone to the University of Ottawa Faculty of Law had all dropped out, isolated and short of money so far south.

A program to train law students in the north gained support. A University of Victoria student working in Iqaluit on a co-op program, persuaded her school join Akitsiraq as its law school partner. Critics opposed spending a million dollars per year on eleven law students when the territory was also short on other professionals such as doctors and teachers. Critics also questioned if southern legal culture would disrupt cultural harmony in the north and if the graduates would even stay in the north.

Recruitment was done via newspaper and radio ads, drawing 108 applications. Applicants did not have to write the Law School Admission Test, deemed unsuitable for screening this pool of applicants. Instead the admissions committee tested each candidate to assess their competence and work history. Each successful applicant was given an allowance of $50,000 from sponsors; in return the students would have to either spend two years working with that sponsor or four years with another Nunavut-based employer.

The original program offering was the Akitsiraq Jump-Start Program which partnered with Nunavut Arctic College to provide 16 students with an enhanced background in law. Through this work the Akitsiraq Society was able to develop the Law School model eventually implemented as Akitsiraq I (2001) and II (2011). These four-year programs deliver the equivalent of a Canadian three-year law degree for students in this isolated region and in a strongly Inuit cultural context.

The Akitsiraq I program was a partnership between the Faculty of Law at the University of Victoria, Nunavut Arctic College and the Akitsiraq Law School Society. It offered a Bachelor of Laws Degree (LL.B) in Iqaluit, Nunavut. to residents of Nunavut and the surrounding Arctic region. This program accepted one intake of students in 2001-02 who graduated in 2004-05. The Akitsiraq I final report Lawyer Making in the Arctic ( [July 2007] Browne, Crawford and Tulloch), is an extensive record of this program, and includes seven appendices incorporating contracts, course selections, timetables, budgets and program evaluation by graduates.

A planned Akitsiraq II program was announced by the parent society in conjunction with the University of Ottawa Law Faculty, using infrastructure and support from Nunavut Arctic College. The announced intention is to proceed with a second cohort of students in 2011. The recruiting and admission process for the 2011 cohort have been funded by Justice Canada, including Akitsiraq Law Days in Cambridge Bay, Rankin Inlet, Iqaluit and Ottawa in the spring of 2010, but the program launch has been on hold since November 2009 awaiting a decision by the Government of Nunavut to provide core support. It did not go through after the Nunavut government declined to provide the funding.

In June 2015, Nellie Kusugak, the Commissioner of Nunavut, promised a return of the Akitsiraq program in her commissioner's address. In September 2017, the new program launched in cooperation with the University of Saskatchewan College of Law.

== Curriculum ==
Akitsiraq operates on a cohort model. Students are admitted in distinct cohorts, forming strong supportive units which learn and live together over the four years of the program. Only one cohort is in process at any time, with students moving together through the initial years and into the more advanced studies, relying on teaching from temporarily assigned professors from the judiciary, southern Canadian Universities, and the legal profession at large. In this way resources can be secured and opportunities developed appropriate to the cohort at each point in their learning and consistent with the small population based from which they are drawn.

The program for Akitsiraq I was taught as a modified law curriculum. The focus in the first year was to ensure academic success for the students. The University of Victoria Faculty of Law developed a Legal Research and Writing Course, which included an enhanced study skills component. The first year also exposed students to contract, criminal law and Legal Processes courses.

In the remaining three years, Akitsiraq I students were required to complete all the standard law courses. The Faculty of Law developed specialized elective courses for this program tailored to legal issues in the Canadian Arctic and the Inuit, including Inuit law, environmental law, northern resource land and management, the Nunavut Land Claims Agreement. The expertise of local elders and educators incorporated Inuit Traditional Law and Inuit Qaujimajatuqangit throughout the four-year program. Students were encouraged to participate during their final year in courses at the University of Victoria or other major Canadian University.

The Akitsiraq II program has continued to develop this approach, planning for two academic and one work term each year. In addition, Akitsiraq II students will have the opportunity to participate with their contemporaries at the University of Ottawa Common Law Faculty each year in the intensive three week January intersession. The introductory program anticipated for June–July 2011, is designed to orient students to the study of law, identify skill areas where additional support will be focused in the early program years, and provide a broad introduction to the classic first year study areas, as well as an initial exposure to the interface between Inuit Law and the Canadian legal tradition.

In order to practise as a lawyer, graduates of the program are required to article to a practising lawyer and pass a Bar Admission Test administered by a Canadian law society.

== Funding ==
Akitsiraq I program was largely funded by the Government of Nunavut through the Departments of Education, Human Resources and Justice. Student financial support was based on salaried sponsorships through various agencies including the Government of Nunavut, the Department of Justice, and several not for profit Inuit organizations. Student funding incorporated a requirements for attendance and post-graduation commitments to remain in their territory or province of origin (most were from Nunavut) and work for a minimum of two or four years following graduation. As of 2010 all Akitsiraq I graduates are working or studying for graduate degrees in Nunavut (9), or in positions related to Nunavut (2).

The Akitsiraq II process has been funded to date by the Department of Justice Canada, in-kind supports from Justice Nunavut, Nunavut Arctic College and the resources of the University of Ottawa. The Society has contributed many hundreds of hours of volunteer support. The student funding model for Akitsiraq II has been designed to be individually based, with paid work-terms and diverse student financial supports, as well as the potential of incorporating specific program supports.

The Society is the guardian of significant unpublished materials on Inuit Law and continues to seek resources to develop these materials for broader access.

== Outcome ==
Participants in the Akitsiraq Jump-Start Program have continued to participate in legal fields.

Eleven people graduated from the Akitsiraq I program, receiving an LLB degree from the University of Victoria. As of June 2009 nine of eleven graduates have been called to practise. This is consistent with or exceeds success rates in southern Canadian university law programs.

Madeleine Redfern, one of the graduates became the first Inuk selected to article as a clerk at the Supreme Court of Canada, under Mme Justice Louise Charron. Others are engaged in Masters of Law programs, practising family and civil law, prosecuting, acting as counsel to aboriginal organizations, and government agencies, working in the RCMP and with Inuktitut language initiatives.

For Akitsiraq II, forty-five students attended the introductory Law Day information sessions across Nunavut and the Society reported over eighty potential students on its waiting lists.

For the Nunavut Law Program, a total of 25 students enrolled in 2017, of which 22 graduated.

== See also ==
- Higher education in Nunavut
