= Georges Sauser-Hall =

Swiss legal scholar (1884–1966)

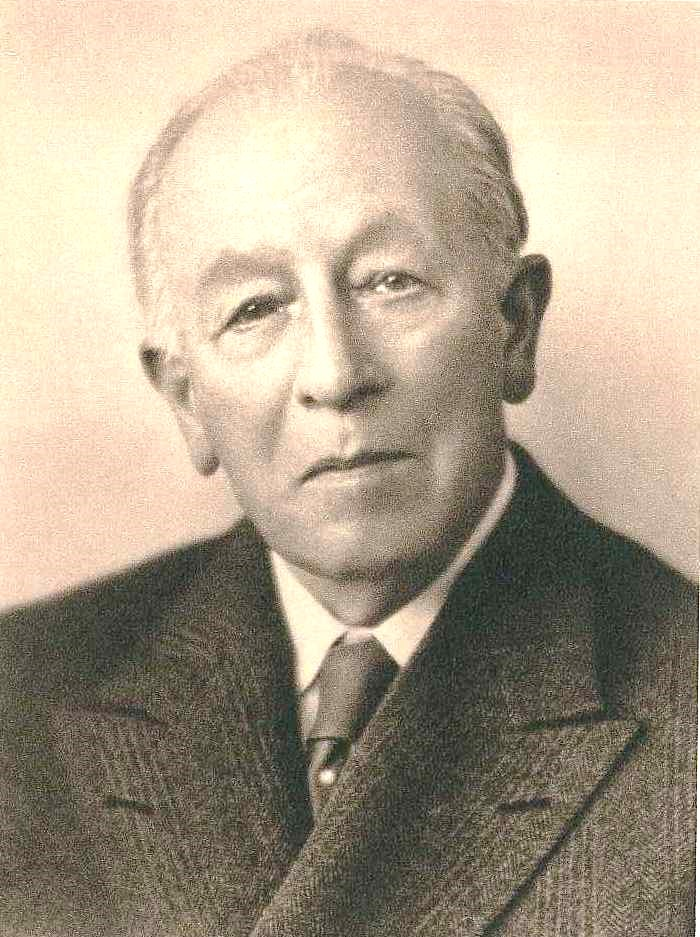
- Born: September 26, 1884; La Chaux-de-Fonds, Switzerland
- Died: March 12, 1966 (aged 81); Geneva, Switzerland
- Occupation: Law Professor
- Spouse: Agnès Hall

Academic background
- Education: University of Neuchâtel, University of Geneva

Academic work
- Discipline: Law
- Sub-discipline: Comparative law, international law
- Institutions: University of Neuchâtel, University of Geneva, University of Istanbul

Georges Sauser-Hall (September 26, 1884 – March 12, 1966) was a Swiss scholar of international and comparative law. He was a professor in Neuchâtel, Geneva, and Istanbul, headed the legal service of the Federal Department of Foreign Affairs in Bern, and was a member of the Permanent Court of Arbitration in The Hague.

== Early life and education ==
Georges Sauser-Hall was born Jean Georges Sauser, son of the merchant and watchmaker Georges Frédéric Sauser and Marie-Louise Dorner. He was the older brother of the writer Blaise Cendrars. He married Agnès Hall in 1908.

As a young man, Sauser-Hall studied law, earning his licentiate in 1906 and becoming a lawyer in 1908.

In 1910, Sauser-Hall earned a doctor of law degree from the University of Geneva. His thesis was on the subject of "Belligerents interned in neutral countries in the event of a land war".

== Career ==
Following his doctoral studies, Sauser-Hall was appointed privat-docent (1911), then Professor of Comparative Law (1912) at the University of Neuchâtel.

From 1915 to 1924, he was deputy and then head of the legal department of the Federal Department of Foreign Affairs in Bern. In 1924 he returned to teaching as Professor of Civil, Comparative and International Private Law at the University of Geneva, where he remained until 1954. From 1925 to 1931, he was also a legal advisor to the Turkish government and taught civil law at Istanbul University.

In 1934, Sauser-Hall was asked by a Swedish court to give an opinion on the effect of the U.S. Executive Order 6102 on a European contract that provided for payment in gold dollars from a U.S. bank. In 1937, he reworked this opinion into a course which he delivered at The Hague Academy of International Law on the subject of clauses in public and private contracts requiring payment in gold.

In 1946, Switzerland appointed him as a member of the Permanent Court of Arbitration in The Hague, and on several occasions he was asked to defend Switzerland before the International Court of Justice. He also chaired the arbitration tribunal set up in the Aramco arbitration between Saudi Arabia and Aramco in 1958, as well as the Italian-United States Conciliation Commission created by under the 1947 peace treaty between Italy and the Allies.

From 1954, he was also a lecturer at the universities of Neuchâtel and Lausanne. From 1957 to 1959, he was President of the Institut de Droit International.

He authored numerous legal works as well as a handbook on Swiss civics for foreigners, Guide politique suisse, which reached its seventh edition in 1965. In 1952, a volume of essays was published in his honor.

Sauser-Hall retired at the age of 70 in 1954 and died March 12, 1966 in Geneva.
