= René David =

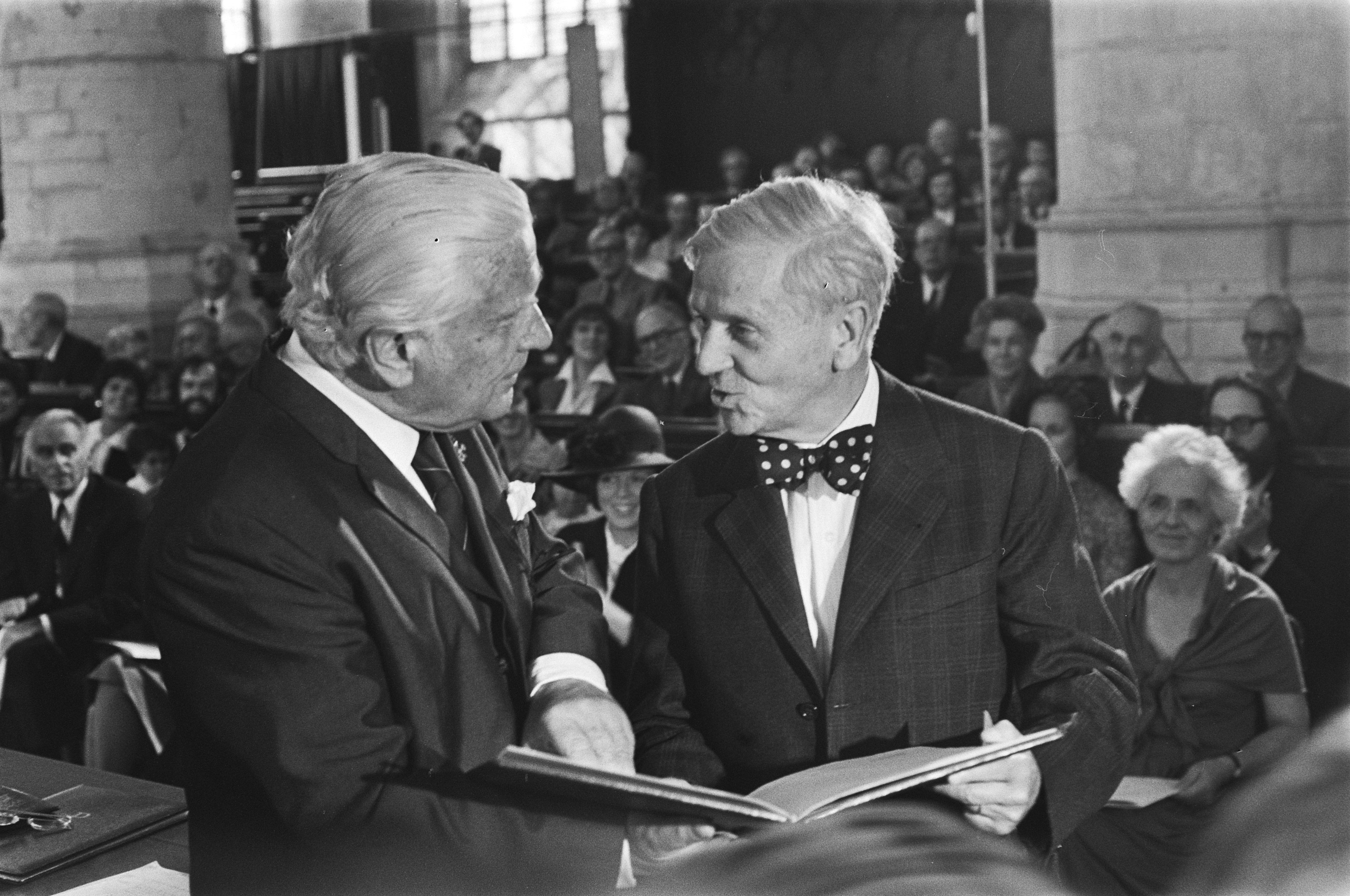
René David (1976)

René David (12 January 1906 in Jura, France – 26 May 1990 in Le Tholonet, France) was a French Professor of Law. His work has been published in eight different languages. He was, in the second half of the 20th century, one of the key representatives in the field of comparative law.

== Biography ==
Between 1929 and 1939, David was a professor at the University of Grenoble. During World War II, he served in the French army. After the war, from 1945 to 1968, he was the chair of comparative law at the Faculty of Law of Paris (University of Paris). Subsequently, from 1968 to 1976, he was a professor at the University of Aix-en-Provence.

He worked on several legal projects and assignments, as in 1930 for UNIDROIT (International Institute for the Unification of Private Law) in Rome. He lectured in various places in the world, including the University of Cambridge (1933–35), Columbia University, the Ludwig-Maximilians-Universität München, and the University of Tehran.

In the sixties, he led the French delegation at the UNCITRAL (United Nations Commission on International Trade Law) and from 1962 to 1978 he was a board member of UNIDROIT. David was one of the writers of the Civil Code of Ethiopia in 1960 and a member of the team that wrote the civil law for Rwanda. He was also, in 1973, the head of the publication of the International Encyclopaedia of Comparative Law.

== Legal theory ==
David, in Traité élémentaire de droit civile comparé, proposed the classification of legal systems, according to the different ideology inspiring each one, into five groups or families:

- Western Laws, a group subdivided into the:
  - Romano-Germanic subgroup (comprising those legal systems where legal science was formulated according to Roman Law – see also Civil law (legal system))
  - Common law
- Soviet Law
- Muslim Law (sharia)
- Hindu Law
- Chinese Law
- Jewish Law (halakha)

Especially with respect to the aggregating by David of the Romano-Germanic and Common Law into a single family, David argued that the antithesis between Common Law and Romano-German Laws, is of a technical rather than of an ideological nature. Of a different kind is, for instance, the antithesis between (say) the Italian and the American Law, and of a different kind that between the Soviet, Muslim, Hindu, or Chinese Law. According to David, the Romano-Germanic legal systems included those countries where legal science was formulated according to Roman Law, whereas common law countries are those where law was created from the judges. The characteristics that he believed uniquely differentiate the Western legal family from the other four are:

- liberal democracy
- capitalist economy
- Christian religion

== Awards ==
David was awarded honorary degrees from the University of Edinburgh, Brussels, Ottawa, Basel, Leicester and Helsinki.

On September 17, 1976, he was honored with Amnesty International, with the Erasmus Prize in the Pieterskerk in Leiden.

== Selected bibliography ==
- (in French) 1929: La protection des minorités dans les sociétés par actions, Librairie du Recueil Sirey, Paris
- (in French) 1947: Cours de législation civile, Les cours de droit, Paris
- (in French) 1948: Introduction à l'étude du droit privé de l'Angleterre, Recueil Sirey, Paris
- (in French) 1950: Traité élémentaire de droit civil comparé: introduction à l'étude des droits étrangers et à la méthode comparative, R. Pichon, R. Durand-Auzias, Paris
- (in French) 1952: French bibliographical digest. Law: books and periodicals, culturele afdeling van de Franse ambassade, New York
- (in French) 1954: Le droit soviétique, met John N Hazard, Librairie générale de droit et de jurisprudence, Paris, 2 volumes
- (in English) 1955: French law, Diocesan press, Madras
- (in English) 1958: The French legal system: an introduction to civil law systems, met Henry P De Vries, Oceana Publications for Parker School of Foreign and Comparative Law, Columbia University, New York
- (in French) 1960: Le Droit français, met Philippe Ardant, Librairie générale de droit et de jurisprudence, Paris
- (in French) 1960: Le droit français. Principes et tendances du droit français, Libr. générale de droit et de jurisprudence, Paris
- (in French) 1962: Cours de droit civil comparé, Les Cours de droit, Paris
- (in French) 1964 Les grands systèmes de droit contemporains, Dalloz, Paris, ISBN 978-2247013791
- (in French) 1964: Bibliographie du droit français, 1945-1960, établie pour le Comité international pour la documentation des sciences sociales sous le patronage de l'Association internationale des sciences juridiques, met International Committee for Social Sciences Documentation, Paris, Mouton
- (in French) 1967: Administrative contracts in the Ethiopian civil code, Ministerie van Justitie, Addis Ababa
- (in English) 1968: Major legal systems in the world today, met John E. C. Brierley, London
- (in English) 1972: French law; its structure, sources, and methodology, State University Press, Baton Rouge, ISBN 978-0807102480
- (in French) 1973: Les Contrats en droit anglais, met Françoise Grivart de Kerstrat, Libr. de Droit et de Jurisprudence R. Pichon et R. Durand-Auzias, Paris
- (in English) 1974: Structure and the divisions of the law, M. Nijhoff, Den Haag
- (in English) 1975: International encyclopedia of comparative law, met International Association of Legal Science, M. Nijhoff, Den Haag, ISBN 978-9024727872
- (in French) 1977: Unification du droit et arbitrage, Kluwer, Deventer, ISBN 978-9026809224
- (in English) 1980: English law and French law: a comparison in substance, Stevens and Sons, London, ISBN 978-0420457509
- (in French) 1982: Le droit comparé: droits d´hier, droitss de demain, Paris, ISBN 2717805605
- (in French) 1982: Les avatars d´un com-paratiste, Paris, ISBN 2-7178-0511-7
- (in French) 1987: Le droit du commerce international: réflexions d´un comparatiste sur le droit international privé, Paris, ISBN 2-7178-1322-5
- (in French) 1995: Le droit anglais, met Xavier Blanc-Jouvan, Presses universitaires de France, Paris, ISBN 978-2130519102
