= Adhémar Esmein =

French jurist

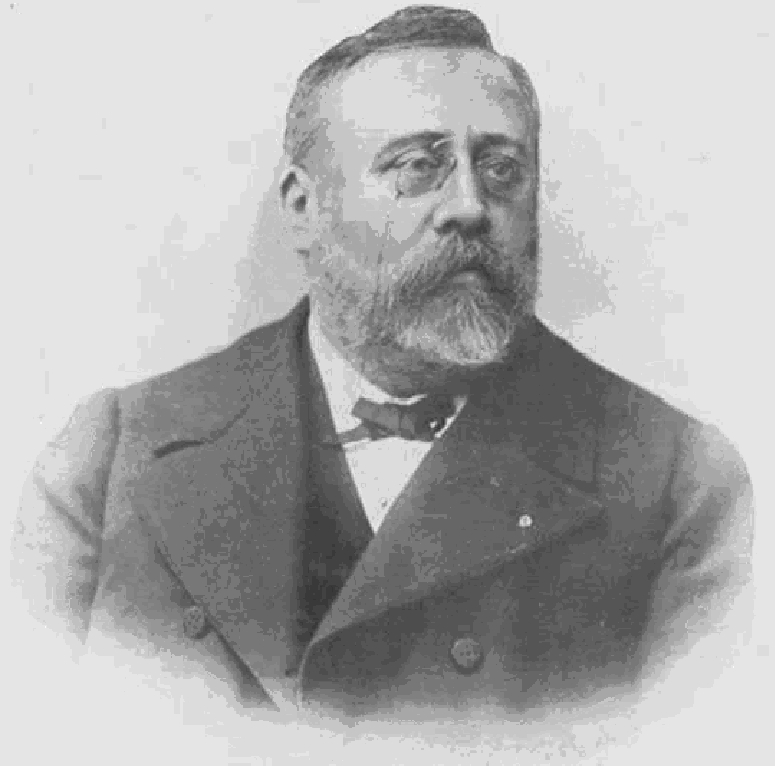
Adhémar Esmein

Jean Paul Hippolyte Emmanuel Adhémar Esmein (1 February 1848 – 22 July 1913) was a French jurist.

He authored numerous textbooks on the history of French public law and French constitutional law. He also wrote numerous monographs on other subjects, particularly including canon law, the teaching of which in France he renewed through his works. His most famous one is perhaps his "History of Continental Criminal Procedure" which was first published in 1913 and has since been widely received in academic literature.

== Biography ==
Esmein obtained the agrégation de droit in 1875, and his doctorate in 1878.

After briefly teaching at Douai, in 1888 Esmein became professor of legal history and constitutional law at Paris. From 1898 until his death, he also taught canon law at the École pratique des hautes études. In 1904, he became a member of the Institute of France.
