= H. Patrick Glenn =

Canadian professor (1940–2014)

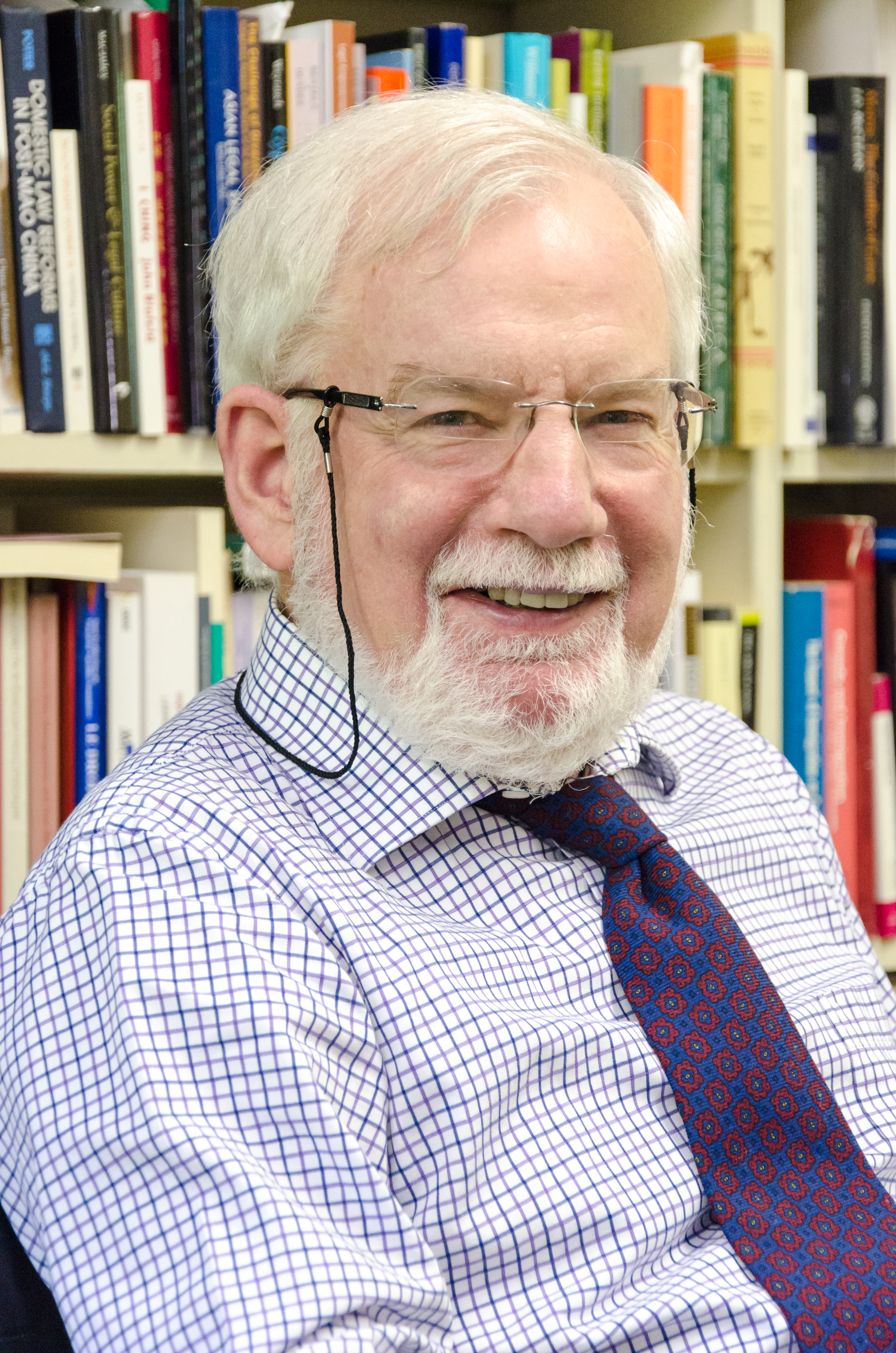
Portrait of McGill Law Professor H. Patrick Glenn, taken on 18 October 2012, in his office in Old Chancellor Day Hall.

Glenn was born in Toronto, Ontario, Canada, in 1940. He studied law at Queen's University and Harvard Law School and earned his doctorate in law at Strasbourg. H. Patrick Glenn (1940–2014) was the Peter M. Laing Professor at the Faculty of Law at McGill University. He specialized in comparative law, private international law, and civil procedure.

== Biography ==
He started his career at McGill University in 1971, recruited by the Faculty of Law to help support the National Program. He became known as a respected scholar in the field of comparative law, specifically comparative civil procedure and private international law. He began publishing in the 1980s and continued for the majority of his career. He is the author of the five editions of Legal Traditions of the World: Sustainable Diversity in Law, published by the Oxford University Press.

Glenn started as an assistant professor in 1971, rising to the rank of associate professor in 1973 and then to Full Professor in 1978, a rank that he held until his passing in 2014.

While he remained at McGill for his entire career, he also had the honor of serving as a visiting professor at a number of illustrious universities throughout the world, including the Université de Montréal (1973), the Université de Fribourg (1985), and the Université française du Pacifique (1992). He was also the Director of Studies at the Hague starting in 1977. In 2012, he was elected president of the American Society of Comparative Law.

In 2006, The Government of Quebec recognized H. Patrick Glenn with the Prix Léon-Gérin in the science category.

== Personal life ==
He was married to Jane Matthews Glenn, another McGill University professor.

== Death ==
Glenn died on 1 October 2014. No information is presently available about the cause or manner of death.

== Books ==
- Legal Traditions of the World: Sustainable Diversity in Law, 5th ed., 2014, Oxford University Press, ISBN 978-0199669837, 019966983X
- The Cosmopolitan State, 2013, Oxford University Press, ISBN 978-0-19-968242-3
- Legal Traditions of the World: Sustainable Diversity in Law, 4th ed., 2010, Oxford University Press, ISBN 0-19-958080-4
- On Common Laws, 2007, Oxford University Press, ISBN 0-19-922765-9

== Awards ==
- Grand Prize of the International Academy of Comparative Law, 2000
- Prix Léon-Gérin, 2006
- Henry G. Schermers Fellowship, 2010 and 2011
- Paul-André Crépeau Medal, 2014 (posthumous)
