= Kotz =

Kotz or Kötz may refer to:

== People with that name ==
- Brad Kotz, American lacrosse player at Syracuse University from 1982 to 1985
- Dorothy Kotz (born 1944), Australian politician
- Eric Kotz, South Australian mariner and author
- H. David Kotz (born 1966), a director in the Financial Institutions practice at Berkeley Research Group, former Inspector General of the U.S. Securities and Exchange Commission
- Hein Kötz (born 1935), German jurist, former Director of the MPI-PRIV, the Bucerius Law School and Vice President of the DFG
- John Kotz (basketball) (1919–1999), American basketball player
- John Kotz (politician) (1930–2014), British Labour Party politician
- Nick Kotz (1932-2020), American journalist, author, and historian
- Richard Kotz (1886–1960), German Wehrmacht officer during World War II
- Samuel Kotz (1930–2010), engineering professor
- Tadeusz Kotz (1913–2008), Polish pilot and fighter ace of World War II

== Other ==
- Kötz, municipality in Bavaria, Germany
- Kötz (Günz), a river of Bavaria, Germany, tributary of the Günz
- KOTZ, non-commercial radio station in Kotzebue, Alaska
- Francis Kotz Farm, also known as The Kotz Place, a historic home located near Wardensville, West Virginia, USA
