= Arthur Taylor von Mehren =

American international law scholar (1922–2006)

Arthur Taylor von Mehren (August 10, 1922 – January 16, 2006) was an American professor at Harvard Law School and a scholar of international law.

== Early life and education ==
Arthur Taylor von Mehren was born on August 10, 1922 at Albert Lea, Minnesota. He was the identical twin brother of Robert von Mehren.

He earned his Bachelor of Science (B.S.) from Harvard College in 1942, followed by a Bachelor of Laws (LL.B.) from Harvard Law School in 1945 and a doctorate in government (Ph.D.) from Harvard University in 1946.

== Career ==
From 1945 to 1946, von Mehren served as a law clerk to Judge Calvert Magruder of the United States Court of Appeals for the First Circuit. From 1947 to 1948, he was stationed in Berlin, Germany, with the U.S. Occupation Military Government, where he served as Chief of the Legislation Branch.

Von Mehren joined Harvard Law School in 1946 as an assistant professor and dedicated the first three years of his career to studying Swiss, German, and French law at the University of Zurich and the University of Paris. In 1953, he was granted tenure as a professor of law at Harvard, later becoming the Story Professor of Law in 1976. From 1991 onward, he held the title of Story Professor of Law Emeritus.

Von Mehren was a founding member and former president of the American Society of Comparative Law, which publishes the American Journal of Comparative Law, a journal he edited from 1952 to 1986. He served on the Editorial Committee for the International Encyclopedia of Comparative Law and advised the Reporter for the Restatement (Second) of Contracts. Von Mehren was a longtime member of the U.S. State Department’s Advisory Committee on Private International Law and headed the United States delegation to the Hague Conference on Private International Law where he participated in the Hague Conference’s diplomatic sessions in 1966, 1968, 1976, 1980, 1985, 1993, 1996, and 2001.

In 1992 he established the Joseph Story Fellow program, which allowed talented young German academics to spend a year working as his research assistants, and mentored the Fellows up to the time of his death. The program produced 12 graduates, who later became members of both German and American law faculties.

Von Mehren was a distinguished member of the American Academy of Arts and Sciences, the Institut de Droit International—where he served as Rapporteur for its 18th Commission from 1984 to 1989—and the International Academy of Comparative Law. He was awarded honorary doctorates by the University of Leuven, Belgium, in 1985 and by the Paris-Panthéon-Assas University, France, in 2000. In 1989 the Japanese government awarded him the Order of the Rising Sun, with golden rays and neck ribbon attached, Third Degree.

== Publications ==
Von Mehren authored over 200 publications.

=== Selected Books ===
- The Civil Law System: An Introduction to the Comparative Study of Law, 1st ed., Englewood Cliffs, N.J., Prentice Hall, 1957; 2nd ed., Boston, Little, Brown and Co., 1977 (with J. R. Gordley).
- XXth Century Comparative and Conflicts Law, Leyden, A. W. Sijthoff, 1961 (edited with K. H. Nadelmann and J. N. Hazard).
- Law in Japan: The Legal Order in a Changing Society, Cambridge, Mass., Harvard University Press, 1963 (editor and contributor).
- Nihon no hô: Hendô suru shakai ni okeru hôchitsujo (Law in Japan: The Legal Order in a Changing Society), Tokyo, Tokyo Daigaku, 1965 (translated by N. Beihoga).
- The Law of Multistate Problems: Cases and Materials on Conflict of Laws, Boston, Little, Brown and Co., 1965 (with D. T. Trautman).
- Law in the United States: A General and Comparative View, Dordrecht, Kluwer, 1988.
- Conflict of Laws: American, Comparative, International (Cases and Materials), St. Paul, Minn., West Group, 1998 (with S. Symeonides and W. Perdue).
- International Commercial Arbitration (A Transnational Perspective), St. Paul, Minn., West Group, 1st ed. 1999; 2nd ed. 2002 (with T. Várady and J. Barceló).

=== Selected Monographs ===
- Recognition and Enforcement of Foreign Judgments — General Theory and the Role of Jurisdictional Requirements, Academy of International Law, 167 Recueil des cours (1980) 9-112 (1981).
- "A General View of Contract," Chapter 1 of Volume VII: Contracts in General, International Encyclopedia of Comparative Law, 1-109 (1982).
- "The Formation of Contracts," Chapter 9 of Volume VII: Contracts in General, International Encyclopedia of Comparative Law, 1-123 (1992).
- "Formal Requirements," Chapter 10 of Volume VII: Contracts in General, International Encyclopedia of Comparative Law, 1-140 (1999).
- Theory and Practice of Adjudicatory Authority in Private International Law: A Comparative Study of the Doctrine, Policies and Practices of Common- and Civil-Law Systems, Academy of International Law, 295 Recueil des cours (2002) (2003).

== Personal life ==
Von Mehren was married to Joan Moore von Mehren. He was fluent in French and German.

== Death ==
Von Mehren died on January 16, 2006, in Cambridge, Massachusetts. He was 83 years old and died of pneumonia.
