= Mirjan Damaška =

- Born: October 8, 1931 (age 94); Brežice, Kingdom of Yugoslavia
- Education: Faculty of Law in Ljubljana (L.D.) International Faculty of Comparative Law in Luxembourg (LL.M.) Faculty of Law in Zagreb (LL.B.)
- Spouse: Marija Damaška (died in 2013)
- Awards: Order of Danica Hrvatska with a face of Ruđer Bošković (2006) Life Award by the American Association for the Comparative Study of Law (2009)
- Scientific career
- Fields: Criminal law
- Workplaces: Yale Law School
- Thesis: Defendant's Testimony as Evidence in a Modern Criminal Proceedings (1960)

Mirjan Damaška (born October 8, 1931) is an American and Croatian jurist and legal scholar, known for his works in the sphere of comparative criminal justice and international criminal law. He was a professor at the Faculty of Law in Zagreb, where he was an acting dean in 1970. He is currently a Sterling Professor emeritus at the Yale Law School, where he has taught since 1976.

== Biography ==
Damaška was born in Brežice in the Kingdom of Yugoslavia, present-day Slovenia in a Croatian family. His hobbies were painting, music and languages. Later, he learned to speak six languages. Prior to the World War II, his family moved to Zagreb, where Damaška finished elementary school and a gymnasium, after which he entered the Faculty of Law at the University of Zagreb in 1950. As a student he showed interest in science, and in his fourth year he gained a scholarship at the Hague Academy of International Law in the Netherlands. He graduated at the Faculty of Law in Zagreb in 1955. Next year, he gained a master's degree in comparative criminal justice at the International Faculty of Comparative Law in Luxembourg.

Between 1956 and 1957 he worked as a law clerk in trial and appellate courts. After that he choose a university career. He was named an assistant at the Faculty of Law in Zagreb in criminal proceedings. He gained his PhD at the Faculty of Law at the University of Ljubljana after successfully defending his dissertation, the Defendant's Testimony as Evidence in a Modern Criminal Proceedings in 1960. He was among the youngest doctors of law in the FNR Yugoslavia. The next year, he became a bicentennial fellow at the University of Pennsylvania, where he taught until 1962. Two years after, he was professor at the International Faculty of Comparative Law in Luxembourg, where he remained for a year. In 1966 he was a visiting professor at the University of Pennsylvania until 1968.

Damaška become the youngest full professor at the University of Zagreb in 1968, where he taught criminal proceedings in a department held by Vladimir Bayer. In 1970 he was named acting dean of the Faculty of Law in Zagreb. In that time, he was among the most significant and the most influential scientific authorities in the sphere of criminal proceedings in the SR Croatia. Between 1970 and 1971 he was a chairman of the Committee on Criminal Justice Reform of the Parliament of the SR Croatia. After the Croatian Spring in 1971, he went to the United States, where he taught at the University of Pennsylvania Law School from 1972 until 1976. Between 1975 and 1976 he was also a visiting professor at the Yale Law School. In 1976 he got three offers from the Berkeley University, the Harvard University and the Yale University. He took offer from the Yale University, and become a Ford Professor at the Yale Law School, where he teaches today as a Sterling Professor emeritus. He teaches or he taught comparative law, international criminal law, evidence law, criminal law, criminal proceedings, international private law and comparative criminal justice.

His book The Faces of Justice and State Authority (1986) is considered to be his most significant work. This book is one of the most important works in the sphere of comparative criminal proceedings in the last century. It made a great impact on the observation and the understanding of different legal systems and warned on the importance of relations between a culture of a society and a way in which certain societies solve disputes. It was translated on several other languages. He also wrote other significant works: the Defendant's Testimony as Evidence in a Modern Criminal Proceedings (1962), the Dictionary of Criminal Law and Proceedings (co-author, 1966), the Comparative Law (1988), the Evidence Law Adrift (1997). He published various works in foreign magazines, mainly in the sphere of criminal law and proceedings, civil proceedings, legal history, comparative law and theory of law.

Damaška was an advisor to several Croatian governments in relations with the International Criminal Tribunal for the former Yugoslavia and the International Court of Justice in the Hague. He was named a special advisor to the prime minister Ivo Sanader in 2010, and a Croatian agent before the International Court of Justice, where he led a team of Croatian and British lawyers in the case Croatia vs. Serbia.

He was awarded the Life Award by the American Association for the Comparative Study of Law from 2009 and Order of Danica Hrvatska with a face of Ruđer Bošković from 2006, as well as the honorary doctorates from the University of Pavia from 2005 and the University of Zagreb from 2012. He is a full member of the American Academy of Arts and Sciences since 1994 and the Croatian Academy of Sciences and Arts since 2002. He is also a member of the American Association for the Comparative Study of Law since 1977, the International Academy of Comparative Law since 1986 and the International Association of Penal Law.
