= Yntema =

Yntema is a surname. Notable people with the surname include:

- Gordon Douglas Yntema (1945–1968), American soldier
- Hessel E. Yntema (1891–1966), American professor
- Janise Yntema (born 1962), American painter
- Orlando Yntema (born 1986), Dutch baseball player
- Theodore O. Yntema (1900–1985), American economist
