= George Bermann =

American legal academic

- Born: 1945 (age 80–81)
- Spouse: Sandra Bermann

Academic background
- Education: Yale University (BA, JD); University of Sussex; Columbia University (LLM)

Academic work
- Discipline: International law
- Institutions: Columbia Law School, Institut d'Études Politiques, Collège d'Europe

George Bermann (born 1945) is an American legal scholar who is an authority on international law. He is the Walter Gelhorn Professor of Law, the Jean Monnet Professor of European Union Law, the director of the Center for International Commercial and Investment Arbitration Law, and the co-director of the European Legal Studies Center at Columbia Law School, as well as a permanent faculty member of the Institut d'Études Politiques (Sciences Po) in Paris, France, and the Collège d'Europe in Bruges, Belgium. Previously, he held the Tocqueville-Fulbright Distinguished Professorship at the University of Paris I (Panthéon-Sorbonne).

== Education and family ==
George Bermann earned his B.A. summa cum laude from Yale College in 1967. He studied at the University of Sussex on a Marshall Scholarship from 1967 to 1968, and received his J.D. from Yale Law School in 1971, where he was an editor of the Yale Law Journal. Bermann earned his LL.M. from Columbia Law School. After working at Davis Polk & Wardwell for four years, he joined Columbia Law School's faculty in 1975. He is married to Sandra Bermann, the Cotsen Professor of the Humanities at Princeton University.

== Academic career ==
Bermann is an expert in comparative law and private international law. His writing has been cited by foreign courts, as well as domestic state and federal courts. He is the past President of the American Society of Comparative Law, the past editor-in-chief of the American Journal of Comparative Law, and the current president of the International Academy of Comparative Law. He is also the chief reporter of the ALI's Restatement of the Law of International Commercial and Investor–State Arbitration and co-editor in chief of the American Review of International Arbitration.

Bermann has testified before Congress on several occasions, including before the Senate Judiciary Committee on the OPEC countries and sovereign immunity (2004), the House Committee on Foreign Affairs on Colombian practice in international arbitration and Andean legislation benefits (2002), and the House Committee on Government Operations on tort liability of federal public officials (1983). He has also advised the National People's Congress of China on government liability and the UK Select Committee of the House of Lords on the ratification of the draft European Union Constitution.

In 2010, he was commissioned by the Iraqi Ministry of Oil and the U.S. Department of Commerce to train Iraqi jurists as part of efforts to rebuild Iraq's legal system following Operation Iraqi Freedom.

== Private practice ==
In 2021, Bermann was rated one of the top international arbitration lawyers in the United States (Band 1) by Chambers and Partners. In the 1990s and 2000s, he represented Argentinian oil company Bridas in its successful $1.23 billion claim against Turkmenistan.

== Honorary degrees and board memberships ==
Bermann has received honorary degrees from the University of Fribourg (2000), the University of Versailles (2011), the Universidade Nova de Lisboa (2019) and the University of Bucharest (2024). In 2001, he was conferred a Jean Monnet Chair by the European Commission. He is a director of the American Arbitration Association, and he and his wife serve on the Board of Overseers of Koç Holding. Bermann is a member of the Crimes Against Humanity Initiative Advisory Council, a project of the Whitney R. Harris World Law Institute at Washington University School of Law in St. Louis to establish the world's first treaty on the prevention and punishment of crimes against humanity.
