= Vivian Curran =

American lawyer

Vivian Curran is an American lawyer currently Distinguished Professor at University of Pittsburgh and is President of American Society of Comparative Law.

== Education ==
- JD, Columbia Law School
- PhD, Columbia University
- MPhil, Columbia University
- MA, Columbia University
- BA, University of Pennsylvania
