= List of Knight's Cross of the Iron Cross recipients (Kn–Kz) =

The Knight's Cross of the Iron Cross (German: Ritterkreuz des Eisernen Kreuzes) and its variants were the highest awards in the military and paramilitary forces of Nazi Germany during World War II. The Knight's Cross of the Iron Cross was awarded for a wide range of reasons and across all ranks, from a senior commander for skilled leadership of his troops in battle to a low-ranking soldier for a single act of extreme gallantry. A total of 7,321 awards were made between its first presentation on 30 September 1939 and its last bestowal on 17 June 1945. (Note: Großadmiral and President of Germany Karl Dönitz, Hitler's successor as Head of State (Staatsoberhaupt) and Supreme Commander of the Armed Forces, had ordered the cessation of all promotions and awards as of 11 May 1945 (Dönitz-decree). Consequently the last Knight's Cross awarded to Oberleutnant zur See of the Reserves Georg-Wolfgang Feller on 17 June 1945 must therefore be considered a de facto but not de jure hand-out.) This number is based on the analysis and acceptance of the Order Commission of the Association of Knight's Cross Recipients (AKCR). Presentations were made to members of the three military branches of the Wehrmacht—the Heer (army), Kriegsmarine (Navy) and Luftwaffe (air force)—as well as the Waffen-SS, the Reichsarbeitsdienst (RAD—Reich Labour Service) and the Volkssturm (German national militia). There were also 43 foreign recipients of the award.

These recipients are listed in the 1986 edition of Walther-Peer Fellgiebel's book, Die Träger des Ritterkreuzes des Eisernen Kreuzes 1939–1945 [The Bearers of the Knight's Cross of the Iron Cross 1939–1945]. Fellgiebel was the former chairman and head of the order commission of the AKCR. In 1996, the second edition of this book was published with an addendum delisting 11 of these original recipients. Author Veit Scherzer has cast doubt on a further 193 of these listings. The majority of the disputed recipients had been nominated for the award in 1945, when the deteriorating situation of Germany during the final days of World War II left a number of nominations incomplete and pending in various stages of the approval process.

Listed here are the 428 Knight's Cross recipients of the Wehrmacht and Waffen-SS whose last name is in the range "Kn–Kz". Fellgiebel himself delisted one and Scherzer has challenged the validity of eight more of these listings. This is the second of two lists of all 717 Knight's Cross of the Iron Cross recipients whose last name starts with "K". The recipients whose last name is in the range "Ka–Km" are listed at List of Knight's Cross of the Iron Cross recipients (Ka–Km). The recipients are initially ordered alphabetically by last name. The rank listed is the recipient's rank at the time the Knight's Cross was awarded.

== Background ==
The Knight's Cross of the Iron Cross and its higher grades were based on four separate enactments. The first enactment, Reichsgesetzblatt I S. 1573 of 1 September 1939 instituted the Iron Cross (Eisernes Kreuz), the Knight's Cross of the Iron Cross and the Grand Cross of the Iron Cross (Großkreuz des Eisernen Kreuzes). Article 2 of the enactment mandated that the award of a higher class be preceded by the award of all preceding classes. As the war progressed, some of the recipients of the Knight's Cross distinguished themselves further and a higher grade, the Knight's Cross of the Iron Cross with Oak Leaves (Ritterkreuz des Eisernen Kreuzes mit Eichenlaub), was instituted. The Oak Leaves, as they were commonly referred to, were based on the enactment Reichsgesetzblatt I S. 849 of 3 June 1940. In 1941, two higher grades of the Knight's Cross were instituted. The enactment Reichsgesetzblatt I S. 613 of 28 September 1941 introduced the Knight's Cross of the Iron Cross with Oak Leaves and Swords (Ritterkreuz des Eisernen Kreuzes mit Eichenlaub und Schwertern) and the Knight's Cross of the Iron Cross with Oak Leaves, Swords and Diamonds (Ritterkreuz des Eisernen Kreuzes mit Eichenlaub, Schwertern und Brillanten). At the end of 1944 the final grade, the Knight's Cross of the Iron Cross with Golden Oak Leaves, Swords, and Diamonds (Ritterkreuz des Eisernen Kreuzes mit goldenem Eichenlaub, Schwertern und Brillanten), based on the enactment Reichsgesetzblatt 1945 I S. 11 of 29 December 1944, became the final variant of the Knight's Cross authorized.

== Recipients ==
Knight's Cross of the Iron Cross (Kn–Kz)
Service	Number of presentations	Posthumous presentations
Heer (incl. RAD)	293	22
Kriegsmarine	16	1
Luftwaffe	96	11
Waffen-SS	23	4

The Oberkommando der Wehrmacht (Supreme Command of the Armed Forces) kept separate Knight's Cross lists, one for each of the three military branches, Heer (Army), Kriegsmarine (Navy), Luftwaffe (Air Force) and for the Waffen-SS. Within each of these lists a unique sequential number was assigned to each recipient. The same numbering paradigm was applied to the higher grades of the Knight's Cross, one list per grade. Of the 428 awards made to servicemen whose last name is in the range "Kn–Kz", 43 were later awarded the Knight's Cross of the Iron Cross with Oak Leaves and nine the Knight's Cross of the Iron Cross with Oak Leaves and Swords; 38 presentations were made posthumously. Heer members, including the RAD, received 293 of the medals; 16 went to the Kriegsmarine, 96 to the Luftwaffe, and 23 to the Waffen-SS. The sequential numbers greater than 843 for the Knight's Cross of the Iron Cross with Oak Leaves are unofficial and were assigned by the Association of Knight's Cross Recipients (AKCR) and are therefore denoted in parentheses.

This along with the + (plus) indicates that a higher grade of Knight's Cross was awarded as well.
This along with the * (asterisk) indicates that the Knight's Cross was awarded posthumously.
This along with the ! (exclamation mark) indicates that author Walther-Peer Fellgiebel has expressed doubt regarding the veracity and formal correctness of the listing.
This along with the ? (question mark) indicates that author Veit Scherzer has expressed doubt regarding the veracity and formal correctness of the listing.

Name	Service	Rank	Role and unit (Note: For an explanation of the various naming schemes used by the Luftwaffe, Heer, Kriegsmarine and Waffen-SS refer to nomenclature used by the Wehrmacht and Waffen-SS.)	Date of award	Notes	Image
Kurt Knaack	Heer	Oberleutnant of the Reserves	Leader of the 2./Infanterie-Regiment 410	5 November 1942	—	—
Hans-Wolfram Knaak	Heer	Oberleutnant	Chief of the 8./Lehr-Regiment z.b.V. 800 "Brandenburg"	3 November 1942*	Killed in action 26 June 1941	
Gustav-Georg Knabe	Heer	Oberstleutnant	Commander of Kradschützen-Bataillon 15	1 June 1941	—	—
Konrad Knabe	Luftwaffe	Hauptmann	Leader of a Kette ("chain" or flight of three) in Fernaufklärungs Staffel Lappland (1.(F)/Aufklärungs-Gruppe 124) (AOK 20. Gebirgsarmee) (Note: According to Scherzer as Leader of a Kette ("chain" or flight of three) in the Aufklärungsstaffel 1.(F)/124 (Kette Lappland).)	16 April 1943	—	—
Reinhold Knacke+	Luftwaffe	Oberleutnant	Pilot in the 3./Nachtjagdgeschwader 1	1 July 1942	Awarded 190th Oak Leaves 7 February 1943	—
Walter Knaf	Luftwaffe	Leutnant	Zugführer (platoon leader) in the 8./Fallschirm-Panzergrenadier-Regiment 2 "Hermann Göring" (Note: According to Scherzer on 5 April 1944 as Zugführer (platoon leader) in the 8./Panzergrenadier-Regiment 2 "Hermann Göring".)	4 April 1944*	Killed in action 8 December 1943	—
Franz Knapp	Heer	Major	Commander of schwere Panzer-Jäger-Abteilung 663	10 September 1944	—	—
Wilhelm Knapp	Luftwaffe	Hauptmann	Staffelkapitän of the 3.(F)/Aufklärungs-Gruppe 123 (Note: According to Scherzer as Staffelkapitän of the Aufklärungsstaffel 3.(F)/121.)	2 November 1940	—	—
Herbert Knappe	Heer	Oberfeldwebel	Zugführer (platoon leader) in the 14./Jäger-Regiment 83	15 May 1944	—	—
Kurt Knappe	Luftwaffe	Unteroffizier	Pilot in the 5./Jagdgeschwader 51 "Mölders"	3 November 1942	—	—
Ernst Knaul	Heer	Unteroffizier	Rifle leader in the 4.(schwere)/Divisions-Füsilier-Bataillon 96	6 March 1944	—	—
Ludwig Knaup	Heer	Hauptmann of the Reserves	Chief of the 2./Sturmgeschütz-Brigade 904	4 October 1944	—	—
Hans-Peter Knaust+	Heer	Major	Commander of Kampfgruppe "Sonnenstuhl" with the II. SS-Panzerkorps (Note: According to Scherzer as commander of Kampfgruppe "Sonnenstuhl" [an alarm unit with the II. SS-Panzerkorps, in the battle area of Arnhem/Netherlands].)	28 September 1944	Awarded 843rd Oak Leaves 17 April 1945	—
Dr. Wilhelm Knauth (Note: According to Scherzer no doctor title and as leader of the 3./schwere Panzer-Abteilung 505.)	Heer	Leutnant of the Reserves	Leader of the 3./Panzer-Abteilung 505	14 November 1943	—	A black-and-white photo of a man protruding from the cupola of a tank wearing a black military uniform, side cap and headset.
Ernst Knebel+	Heer	Oberst	Commander of Feld-Ersatz-Regiment Panzer AOK 3 and Armeewaffenschule (Note: According to Scherzer as commander of Feld-Ersatz-Regiment Panzer AOK 3.)	27 August 1944	Awarded 744th Oak Leaves 19 February 1945	—
Rudolf von Knebel-Doeberitz? (Note: Rudolf von Knebel-Doeberitz's original nomination for the Knight's Cross by his unit was either lost or not forwarded due to the military situation. A second nomination was made after the evacuation of East Prussia and the capitulation of Germany. This nomination was never processed. The order commission of the Association of Knight's Cross Recipients (AKCR) handled this case in 1982 and decided: "Knight's Cross yes, 8 May 1945". The presentation date was later changed by Walther-Peer Fellgiebel.)	Heer	Major im Generalstab (in the General Staff)	Ia (operations officer) of the 24. Panzer-Division	11 May 1945	—	—
Siegfried Knemeyer	Luftwaffe	Major im Stabsamt des RLM (Note: According to Scherzer as Major.)	Gruppenkommandeur of Aufklärungs-Lehr-Gruppe of the OB.d.L.	29 August 1943	—	
Wasmod von dem Knesebeck	Heer	Oberstleutnant im Generalstab (in the General Staff)	Ia (operations officer) of the 306. Infanterie-Division	14 May 1944	—	—
Wilhelm Knetsch	Heer	Major	Commander of Infanterie-Regiment 545	8 October 1942	—	—
Walter Kniep	Waffen-SS	SS-Sturmbannführer	Commander of SS-Sturmgeschütz-Abteilung 2 "Das Reich" (Note: According to Scherzer as commander of SS-Sturmgeschütz-Abteilung 2.)	14 August 1943	—	—
Walter Knirsch	Heer	Feldwebel	Zugführer (platoon leader) in the 14./Grenadier-Regiment 89	21 December 1944	—	—
Gustav Knittel	Waffen-SS	SS-Sturmbannführer	Commander of SS-Panzer-Aufklärungs-Abteilung 1 "Leibstandarte SS Adolf Hitler" (Note: According to Scherzer as commander of SS-Panzer-Aufklärungs-Abteilung 1.)	4 June 1944	—	—
Otto von Knobelsdorff+	Heer	Generalleutnant	Commander of the 19. Panzer-Division	17 September 1941	Awarded 322nd Oak Leaves 12 November 1943; 100th Swords 21 September 1944	—
Leo Knobloch	Heer	Unteroffizier	Kompanietruppführer (company headquarters lsection eader) in the 1./Reiter-Regiment 32	30 September 1944	—	—
Heinz Knoche	Heer	Major	Leader of Panzergrenadier-Regiment 33	5 April 1945	—	—
Fritz Knöchlein	Waffen-SS	SS-Obersturmbannführer	Commander of SS-Freiwilligen-Panzergrenadier-Regiment 23 "Norge" (Note: According to Scherzer as commander of SS-Panzergrenadier-Regiment 23 "Norge" (Norwegian Nr. 1).)	16 November 1944	—	—
Egon Knörrchen	Heer	Hauptmann of the Reserves	Chief of the 4./Artillerie-Regiment 218	28 March 1945	—	—
Walter Knoespel	Heer	Hauptmann	Company chief in Infanterie-Regiment 156 (motorized)	17 January 1942	—	—
Heinz Knoke	Luftwaffe	Hauptmann	Gruppenkommandeur of the III./Jagdgeschwader 11	27 April 1945	—	—
Karl-Heinz Knollmann	Heer	Leutnant of the Reserves	Company leader in Grenadier-Regiment 45	21 March 1944	—	—
Dr. med. dent. Rolf Knoop	Heer	Major	Commander of the I./Grenadier-Regiment 377	26 July 1944	—	—
Waldemar von Knoop	Heer	Major of the Reserves	Commander of Radfahr-Abteilung 8	26 March 1943	—	—
Albert Knop	Heer	Hauptmann	Commander of the III./Grenadier-Regiment 118	17 August 1943	—	—
Karl-Heinz Knorr	Luftwaffe	Hauptmann	Commander of the I./Flak-Sturm-Abteilung 7 (Note: According to Scherzer as commander of the Flak-Sturm-Abteilung I./7.)	28 February 1945*	Died of wounds 9 February 1945	—
Walter Knorr	Heer	Unteroffizier	Group leader in the 6./Panzergrenadier-Regiment 108	6 March 1944	—	—
Georg Knostmann	Heer	Hauptmann of the Reserves	Regiment adjutant in Grenadier-Regiment 266 (Note: According to Scherzer as adjutant in Grenadier-Regiment 266.)	4 May 1944	—	—
Josef Knotzer	Heer	Major	Leader of Alarmeinheit (emergency unit) in the 9. Panzer-Division (Note: According to Scherzer as commander of the Fliegerhorst (airfield) Wiesbaden, leader of the Alarmeinheit (emergency unit) in area of Wiesbaden near Remagen.)	23 March 1945	—	—
Heinrich Knüppel	Heer	Major	Commander of the II./Infanterie-Regiment 256	7 August 1942	—	—
Karl-Günther Knüppel	Heer	Leutnant of the Reserves	Zugführer (platoon leader) in the Stabskompanie/Grenadier-Regiment 51 (motorized)	17 December 1943	—	—
Karl Knüttel	Heer	Oberfeldwebel	Zugführer (platoon leader) in the 1./Panzer-Jäger-Abteilung 200	3 November 1944	—	—
Friedrich-Karl Knust	Luftwaffe	Oberstleutnant	Geschwaderkommodore of (K)/Lehrgeschwader 1 (Note: According to Scherzer as Geschwaderkommodore of Lehrgeschwader 1.)	3 May 1942	—	—
Friedrich-Wilhelm Knuth	Heer	Major	Leader of Grenadier-Regiment 211	6 March 1944	—	—
Hermann Knuth	Kriegsmarine	Kapitän zur See	Chief of the 1. Sicherungsdivision	24 September 1944	—	—
Gerhard Koall	Luftwaffe	Hauptmann	Gruppenkommandeur of the IV./Jagdgeschwader 54	10 October 1944	—	—
Horst Koberling	Heer	Oberleutnant of the Reserves	Leader of the II./Panzergrenadier-Regiment 25	30 April 1945	—	—
Herbert Kobersky	Heer	Unteroffizier	Zugführer (platoon leader) in Regiments Gruppe 481 (Note: According to Scherzer as Zugführer (platoon leader) in Grenadier-Regiments Gruppe 481.)	4 October 1944	—	—
Alfred Koch? (Note: No evidence of the award can be found in the German Federal Archives. The award was unlawfully presented by SS-Oberstgruppenführer Sepp Dietrich. The date is taken from the announcement made by the 6. SS-Panzerarmee.)	Waffen-SS	SS-Obersturmführer	Leader of the II./SS-Panzergrenadier-Regiment 3 "Deutschland"	6 May 1945*	Killed in action 3 May 1945	—
Alfred Koch	Luftwaffe	Oberleutnant	Leader of the 2./leichte Flak-Abteilung 71	7 April 1945	—	—
August Koch	Heer	Hauptmann	Leader of a Kampfgruppe in the fortress Posen (Note: According to Scherzer as leader of a Kampfgruppe of Grenadier-Regiment 50 in the fortress Posen [presumably a "Gneisenau-Einheit" of Wehrkreis III].)	20 February 1945	—	—
Dr. rer.pol. Dietrich Koch	Heer	Feldwebel	Zugführer (platoon leader) in the 3./Panzer-Jäger-Abteilung 88	23 February 1942	—	—
Dietrich Koch! (Note: According to Fellgiebel Dietrich Koch is delisted without reason.)	Heer	Leutnant	Leader of the 8./Panzer-Regiment 5 in the DAK	13 April 1942	—	—
Erwin Koch	Heer	Major	Commander of the II./Grenadier-Regiment 447	28 May 1943	—	—
Friedrich Koch	Heer	General der Infanterie zur Verwendung (for disposition) (Note: According to Scherzer as General der Infanterie.)	Commanding general of the XXXXIV. Armeekorps	13 October 1941	—	—
Karl Koch	Luftwaffe	Oberfeldwebel	Zugführer (platoon leader) in the III./Fallschirmjäger-Regiment 15 (Note: According to Scherzer as leader of Sturmzug (assault platoon) of the III./Fallschirmjäger-Regiment 15.)	24 October 1944*	Killed in action 29 July 1944	—
Max Koch	Heer	Oberstleutnant of the Reserves	Commander of Grenadier-Regiment 585	4 June 1944*	Killed in action 15 April 1944	—
Theodor Koch	Heer	Oberleutnant	Chief of the 6./Artillerie-Regiment 36 (motorized)	2 September 1944	—	—
Walter Koch	Luftwaffe	Hauptmann	Commander of Fallschirmjäger-Sturm-Abteilung "Koch" (Note: According to Scherzer as commander of Luftlande-Sturm-Abteilung "Koch".)	10 May 1940	—	A man wearing a military uniform with an Iron Cross displayed at his neck.
Willi Koch+	Heer	Feldwebel	Leader of the 6./Grenadier-Regiment 32	16 April 1944	Awarded 612th Oak Leaves 16 October 1944	A man wearing a military uniform with an Iron Cross displayed at the front of his uniform collar.
Willi Koch	Luftwaffe	Oberfeldwebel	Zugführer (platoon leader) in the 3./Fallschirmjäger-Regiment 1	9 June 1944	—	—
Rudolf Koch-Erpach	Heer	Generalleutnant	Commander of the 8. Infanterie-Division	24 June 1940	—	—
Johann Kochanowski	Heer	Oberwachtmeister	Zugführer (platoon leader) in the 2./Sturmgeschütz-Abteilung 201	15 October 1942	—	—
Karl Kochendörfer	Heer	Unteroffizier	Geschützführer (gun layer) in the 3.(schwere)/Schnelle Abteilung 296	18 September 1942	—	—
Josef Kociok	Luftwaffe	Oberfeldwebel	Pilot in the 10.(NJ)/Zerstörergeschwader 1	31 July 1943	—	
Heinrich Kodré	Heer	Major	Commander of the II./Infanterie-Regiment 123	14 May 1941	—	—
Ludwig Köchle	Waffen-SS	SS-Oberscharführer	Shock troops leader and Zugführer (platoon leader) in the 5./SS-"Totenkopf"-Infanterie-Regiment 1	28 February 1942	—	—
Friedrich Köchling	Heer	Generalmajor	Commander of the 254. Infanterie-Division	31 July 1942	—	—
Reinhold Köck	Heer	Hauptmann of the Reserves	Company chief in Grenadier-Regiment 469	5 January 1945	—	—
Hans Köckerbauer	Heer	Oberfeldwebel	Zugführer (platoon leader) in the 13./Gebirgsjäger-Regiment 91	18 November 1941	—	—
Hans-Joachim von Koeckeritz	Heer	Rittmeister of the Reserves	Commander of Divisions-Füsilier-Bataillon (A.A.) 32	10 February 1944*	Killed in action 4 February 1944	—
Alfred Koeditz	Luftwaffe	Leutnant of the Reserves (Note: According to Scherzer as Leutnant (war officer).)	Pilot in the Stab/Kampfgruppe z.b.V. 100	23 December 1942	—	—
Armin Köhler	Luftwaffe	Hauptmann	Gruppenkommandeur of the III./Jagdgeschwader 77	7 February 1945	—	—
Carl-Erik Koehler	Heer	Generalleutnant	Commander of the 306. Infanterie-Division	4 May 1944	—	—
Fritz Köhler	Luftwaffe	Oberstleutnant	Gruppenkommandeur of Fernaufklärungs-Gruppe 122	4 November 1941	—	—
Georg Köhler	Heer	Leutnant (Note: According to Scherzer as Leutnant of the Reserves.)	Leader of the 3./Panzergrenadier-Regiment 26	3 January 1943	—	—
Hans-Joachim Köhler	Heer	Rittmeister	Commander of the I./Reiter-Regiment 31	5 March 1945	—	—
Heinrich Köhler	Heer	Leutnant of the Reserves	Zugführer (platoon leader) in the 3./Heeres-Sturmgeschütz-Brigade 210	20 April 1945	—	—
Dr. jur. Helmut Koehler	Heer	Hauptmann of the Reserves	Leader of Panzer-Aufklärungs-Abteilung 1	3 November 1944	—	—
Helmut Köhler	Heer	Hauptmann (Note: According to Scherzer as Hauptmann of the Reserves.)	Leader of the II./Grenadier-Regiment 154	18 February 1945	—	—
Rudolf Köhler	Heer	Major	Commander of the I./Schützen-Regiment 73	27 July 1941	—	—
Siegfried Köhler	Heer	Unteroffizier	Messenger squadron leader in the I./Panzergrenadier-Regiment 108	17 March 1945	—	—
Walter Koehler? (Note: Walter Koehler's nomination by his unit was sent to the Heerespersonalamt (HPA—Army Staff Office) as a teleprinter message on 15 May 1945. The HPA received this message on 16 May 1945. Major Joachim Domaschk noted "not processed". The presentation date is an assumption of the Association of Knight's Cross Recipients (AKCR).)	Heer	Oberfeldwebel	Zugführer (platoon leader) in the 3./schwere Heeres-Panzer-Jäger-Abteilung 525	11 May 1945	—	—
Werner Köhler	Heer	Hauptmann	Battalion commander in Füsilier-Regiment 26	13 February 1945	—	—
Hans-Günther Koehne	Luftwaffe	Hauptmann	Staffelkapitän of the Stabsstaffel/Sturzkampfgeschwader 2 "Immelmann"	3 November 1942	—	—
Hermann Köhnen	Heer	Hauptmann	Leader of the I./Grenadier-Regiment 1145	28 February 1945	—	—
Otto Köhnke	Luftwaffe	Hauptmann	Gruppenkommandeur of the II./Kampfgeschwader 54	1 August 1942	—	—
Otto Kölbel	Heer	Obergefreiter	Group leader in the 2./Grenadier-Regiment 542	1 June 1943	—	—
Jürgen Köllner	Heer	Hauptmann	Commander of the II./Grenadier-Regiment 671	4 May 1944	—	—
Erich Kölsch	Heer	Unteroffizier	Group leader in the 3./Pionier-Bataillon 263	18 November 1944	—	—
Friedrich von Koenen	Heer	Hauptmann	Commander of the III./4. Regiment "Brandenburg" (a unit of the Abwehr) (Note: According to Scherzer as commander of the III./Regiment 4 "Brandenburg".)	16 September 1943	—	—
Alfons König+	Heer	Oberleutnant of the Reserves	Chief of the 6./Infanterie-Regiment 199 (Note: According to Scherzer as chief of the 6./Infanterie-Regiment 199 "List".)	21 December 1940	Awarded 194th Oak Leaves 21 February 1943; 70th Swords 9 June 1944	—
Christian König	Heer	Hauptmann	Leader of the II./Grenadier-Regiment 41 (motorized)	5 January 1943	—	—
Ernst König+	Heer	Major	Leader of Grenadier-Regiment 12	16 September 1943	Awarded 598th Oak Leaves 21 September 1944	—
Eugen König+	Heer	Major	Acting commander of Infanterie-Regiment 352 (Note: According to Scherzer as leader of Infanterie-Regiment 352.)	1 August 1942	Awarded 318th Oak Leaves 4 November 1943	—
Georg König	Heer	Feldwebel	Zugführer (platoon leader) in the 1./Panzer-Abteilung 18	13 September 1943	—	—
Hans-Heinrich Koenig	Luftwaffe	Oberleutnant	Leader of the I./Jagdgeschwader 11 (Note: According to Scherzer as Staffelkapitän of the 3./Jagdgeschwader 11.)	19 August 1944*	Killed in flying accident 24 May 1944	—
Heinrich König	Heer	Hauptmann	Commander of the I./Grenadier-Regiment 915	14 February 1945	—	—
Heinz Koenig (Note: According to Scherzer name is Franz-Heinz Koenig.)	Luftwaffe	Leutnant	Leader of the 3./Fallschirm-Sturmgeschütz-Abteilung "Hermann Göring"	8 February 1945	—	—
Herbert König	Luftwaffe	Oberfeldwebel	Pilot in the 12./Transportgeschwader 1	9 June 1944	—	—
Reinhard König	Kriegsmarine	Oberleutnant (Ing.)	Chief engineer on U-123	8 July 1944	—	—
Rudolf König	Heer	Feldwebel	Zugführer (platoon leader) in the 2./Panzergrenadier-Regiment 74	17 December 1942	—	—
Viktor König	Luftwaffe	Feldwebel	Observer in the 14.(Eis)/Kampfgeschwader 55	6 October 1944*	Killed in action 29 August 1944	—
Wilhelm König	Heer	Oberleutnant of the Reserves	Chief of the 1./Kavallerie-Regiment "Mitte"	10 September 1943	—	—
Walter Koeppel	Heer	Unteroffizier	Geschützführer (gun layer) in the 14.(Panzerjäger)/Grenadier-Regiment 111 (Note: According to Scherzer as Geschützführer (gun layer) in the 14./Grenadier-Regiment 111.)	15 February 1943	—	—
Eckhardt Köppen	Luftwaffe	Unteroffizier	Kompanietruppführer (company headquarters leader) in the 1./Fallschirm-Panzer-Pionier-Bataillon 2 "Hermann Göring"	15 March 1945	—	—
Gerhard Köppen+	Luftwaffe	Feldwebel	Pilot in the 7./Jagdgeschwader 52 (Note: According to Scherzer as pilot in the 8./Jagdgeschwader 52.)	18 December 1941	Awarded 79th Oak Leaves 27 February 1942	—
Herbert Koepsell	Luftwaffe	Unteroffizier	Kompanietruppführer (company headquarters leader) in the 1./Fallschirm-Panzer-Pionier-Bataillon 2 "Hermann Göring"	7 February 1945	—	—
Adolf Körner	Heer	Oberleutnant of the Reserves	Leader of the 7./Artillerie-Regiment 168	20 January 1945	—	—
Friedrich Körner	Luftwaffe	Leutnant	Staffelführer of the 2./Jagdgeschwader 27 (Note: According to Scherzer as pilot in the I./Jagdgeschwader 27.)	6 September 1942	—	—
Helmut Körner	Heer	Leutnant of the Reserves	Zugführer (platoon leader) in the 2./Panzer-Jäger-Regiment 656	3 December 1943	—	—
Karl Körner	Waffen-SS	SS-Hauptscharführer	Zugführer (platoon leader) in the 2./schwere SS-Panzer-Abteilung 503	29 April 1945	—	—
Martin Körner	Luftwaffe	Oberleutnant (Note: According to Scherzer as Oberleutnant of the Reserves.)	Staffelkapitän of the 4./Kampfgruppe z.b.V. 9	14 March 1943	—	—
Walter Körner? (Note: Walter Körner's nomination by his unit was received by the Heerespersonalamt (HPA—Army Staff Office) end of March 1945. There is no entry date listed on the file card nor in the book "Verliehene Ritterkreuze" (Awarded Knight Crosses). The HPA created a nomination request with the number 4980, which does not exist anymore, and according to the file card was submitted for further processing on 4 April 1945. No further comments or notes indicate that the nomination was finalized. Mr Meentz of the German Federal Archives stated on 20 July 2004 that it cannot be verified that Körner received the Knight's Cross. Walther-Peer Fellgiebel assigned the presentation date. Krätschmer claims that the award was approved on 9 May 1945.)	Waffen-SS	SS-Hauptsturmführer	Regiment adjutant of SS-Freiwilligen-Panzergrenadier-Regiment 23 "Norge"	11 May 1945*	Killed in action 6 March 1945	—
Peter Körte	Heer	Oberst	Commander of Füsilier-Regiment 26	27 September 1943	—	—
Alfons Köster	Luftwaffe	Oberfeldwebel	Pilot in the 3./Nachtjagdgeschwader 2	29 October 1942	—	—
Alfred Koester	Heer	Oberst	Commander of Panzergrenadier-Regiment 200	10 May 1943	—	—
Helmut Köster	Luftwaffe	Feldwebel	Pilot in the 1./Schlachtgeschwader 2 "Immelmann" (Note: According to Scherzer as pilot in the I./Schlachtgeschwader 2 "Immelmann".)	8 August 1944*	Killed in flying accident 8 August 1944	—
Walter Köster	Heer	Hauptmann	Commander of the III./Infanterie-Regiment 156 (motorized)	30 October 1941	—	—
Wilhelm Köther	Heer	Oberleutnant	Chief of the 1./Divisions-Aufklärungs-Abteilung 257 (Note: According to Scherzer as chief of the 1./Aufklärungs-Abteilung 257.)	27 May 1942	—	—
Werner Kötke	Heer	Hauptmann	Commander of the I./Grenadier-Regiment 994	23 August 1944*	Killed in action 17 July 1944	—
Karl Koetz+	Heer	Hauptmann	Commander of the II./Infanterie-Regiment 463	2 October 1941	Awarded 374th Oak Leaves 24 January 1944	—
Florian Kofler	Heer	Major	Commander of the II./Jäger-Regiment 56	16 November 1944*	Died of wounds 31 October 1944	—
Christoph Kohl	Heer	Unteroffizier	Kompanietruppführer (company headquarters leader) in the 2./Panzergrenadier-Regiment 12 (Note: According to Scherzer as Kompanietruppführer (company headquarters leader) in the 5./Panzergrenadier-Regiment 12.)	14 May 1944	—	—
Helmut Kohla	Heer	Oberfeldwebel	Zugführer (platoon leader) in the 4./Panzer-Abteilung 21	16 August 1943	—	—
Franz Kohlauf	Kriegsmarine	Korvettenkapitän	Chief of the 4. Torpedobootflottille	29 October 1943	—	—
Wilhelm Kohler+	Heer	Hauptmann	Leader of a Kampfgruppe in Infanterie-Regiment 195	10 December 1942	Awarded 607th Oak Leaves 4 October 1944	—
Otto Kohlermann	Heer	Oberst	Artilleriekommandeur 129	22 February 1942	—	—
Karl Kohlhaas	Heer	Unteroffizier	Zugführer (platoon leader) in the 7./Grenadier-Regiment 485	4 May 1944	—	—
Ludwig Kohlhaas	Heer	Oberstleutnant (Note: According to Scherzer as Major.)	Commander of the III./Füsilier-Regiment "Großdeutschland"	21 November 1942	—	—
Kurt Kohlhagen	Luftwaffe	Leutnant	Pilot and observer in the 1.(N)/Aufklärungs-Gruppe 2 (Note: According to Scherzer as pilot and observer in the 1./Nahaufklärungsgruppe 2.)	30 September 1944	—	—
Hanns Kohmann	Luftwaffe	Hauptmann	Pilot in the Fliegerstaffel des Führers (Note: According to Scherzer as pilot in the 2./Fernaufklärungsgruppe 5.)	28 February 1945	—	—
Bruno Kohnz+	Heer	Oberfeldwebel	Zugführer (platoon leader) in the 11./Jäger-Regiment 207	17 December 1942	Awarded 207th Oak Leaves 6 March 1943	—
Franz-Josef Kohout	Heer	Hauptmann	Leader of the II./Panzer-Regiment 33	4 December 1941	—	—
[Dr.] Siegfried Koitschka (Note: The brackets around the doctor title [Dr.] denotes that the academic title was attained after the Knight's Cross of the Iron Cross was awarded.)	Kriegsmarine	Oberleutnant zur See	Commander of U-616	27 January 1944	—	—
Ewald Koj? (Note: Ewald Koj's nomination by his unit was received by the Heerespersonalamt (HPA—Army Staff Office) on 15 April 1945. Major Joachim Domaschk decided on 16 April: "Actions, even if posthumously, do not justify presentation of the Knight's Cross." A Heerespersonalamt-Verleihungsvorschlag (HPA-VV—Army Staff Office Nomination Recommendation) Nr. 5077 was created on 18 April and then forwarded, indicating that the nomination had been rejected. No further information regarding the approval or presentation of the Knight's Cross is indicated. The book "Verliehene Ritterkreuze" (Awarded Knight Crosses) notes an entry date of 16 April and forwarded on 18 April. The presentation date was assigned by Walther-Peer Fellgiebel.)	Heer	Hauptmann	Chief of the 3./Gebirgs-Artillerie-Regiment 8 (8. Jäger-Division)	9 May 1945*	Killed in action 11 March 1945	—
Heinz Kokott	Heer	Oberst	Commander of Grenadier-Regiment 337	17 March 1943	—	—
Fritz Kolb	Luftwaffe	Fahnenjunker-Feldwebel	Pilot in the 5./Transportgeschwader 3	9 June 1944	—	—
Richard Kolb	Luftwaffe	Major of the Reserves	Commander of leichte Flak-Abteilung 91 (motorized) (Note: According to Scherzer as commander of leichte Flak-Abteilung 91.)	12 November 1941	—	—
Werner Kolb+	Heer	Major of the Reserves	Commander of the II./Infanterie-Regiment 36	27 June 1942	Awarded 514th Oak Leaves 26 June 1944	—
Hans Kolbeck	Heer	Oberfeldwebel	Zugführer (platoon leader) in the 1./Grenadier-Regiment 1083	24 February 1945*	Killed in action 18 February 1945	—
Dr. med. dent. Rudolf Kolbeck+	Heer	Oberstleutnant of the Reserves (Note: According to Scherzer as Major of the Reserves.)	Commander of Grenadier-Regiment 316	20 April 1943	Awarded 403rd Oak Leaves 22 February 1944	—
Hans Kolbow	Luftwaffe	Oberleutnant	Staffelkapitän of the 6./Jagdgeschwader 51	27 July 1941*	Killed in action 16 July 1941	—
Friedemann Kolbus	Heer	Oberleutnant	Chief of the 3./Panzer-Jäger-Abteilung 161	9 December 1944	—	—
Heinz Kolczyk	Heer	Rittmeister	Commander of Panzer-Aufklärungs-Abteilung 7	6 April 1944	—	—
Johannes Koll	Heer	Leutnant	Leader of the 2./Grenadier-Regiment 696	24 December 1944	—	—
Richard Koll	Heer	Oberst	Commander of Panzer-Regiment 11	15 July 1941	—	
Reinhard Kollak	Luftwaffe	Oberfeldwebel	Pilot in the 8./Nachtjagdgeschwader 4 (Note: According to Scherzer as pilot in the 7./Nachtjagdgeschwader 4.)	29 August 1943	—	—
Botho Kollberg+	Heer	Oberstleutnant	Commander of Infanterie-Regiment 23	6 September 1942	Awarded 384th Oak Leaves 8 February 1944	—
Gerhard Kollehn	Heer	Major	Leader of Jäger-Regiment 38	11 December 1944	—	—
Albert Koller	Luftwaffe	Oberleutnant	Staffelkapitän of the 4./Kampfgeschwader 55	13 November 1942	—	—
Gustav Koller	Heer	Obergefreiter	Group leader in the 1./Panzergrenadier-Regiment 21	8 August 1944	—	—
Karl Koller	Luftwaffe	Oberst im Generalstab (in the General Staff)	Chief of the general staff of Luftflotte 2 (Note: According to Scherzer as chief of the general staff of Luftflotte 3.)	10 April 1942	—	—
Gerhard Kollewe+	Luftwaffe	Hauptmann	Gruppenkommandeur of the II.(Kampf)/Lehrgeschwader 1	5 July 1941	Awarded 112th Oak Leaves 12 August 1942	Man in uniform
Josef Kollhofer	Heer	Obergefreiter	Geschützführer (gun layer) in the 4./Panzergrenadier-Regiment 26 (Note: According to Scherzer as Geschützführer (gun layer) in the 4.(schwer)/Panzergrenadier-Regiment 26.)	14 August 1944	—	—
Friedrich Karl Kollmann	Heer	Leutnant of the Reserves	Zugführer (platoon leader) in Panzergrenadier-Regiment 59	6 October 1944	—	—
Georg Kolodziejczyk	Heer	Oberfeldwebel	Zugführer (platoon leader) in the 3./Panzer-Regiment 15	5 March 1945	—	—
Wolfgang Koltermann	Heer	Oberleutnant (Note: According to Scherzer as Oberleutnant of the Reserves.)	Chief of the 3./schwere Panzer-Abteilung 507	11 March 1945	—	—
Herbert Kompch	Luftwaffe	Hauptmann	Commander of the I./Flak-Regiment 4 (motorized) (Note: According to Scherzer as commander of the I./Flak-Regiment 4.)	11 March 1944	—	—
Günther Konopacki+	Heer	Oberleutnant	Leader of Aufklärungs-Abteilung 168	19 December 1943	Awarded 797th Oak Leaves 23 March 1945	—
Gerhard Konopka	Heer	Oberleutnant of the Reserves	Leader of the II./Grenadier-Regiment (motorized) "Großdeutschland"	29 August 1943	—	—
Alfred Konrad	Heer	Oberwachtmeister	Zugführer (platoon leader) in the 1./Aufklärungs-Abteilung 7	8 August 1943	—	—
Rudolf Konrad	Heer	General der Gebirgstruppe	Commanding general of the XXXXIX. Gebirgskorps	1 August 1942	—	—
Dr. jur. Lambert Konschegg von Pramburg	Luftwaffe	Major	Gruppenkommandeur of the III./Kampfgeschwader 40	28 February 1945	—	Black-and-white portrait of a smiling man in semi profile wearing a suit and tie.
Wilhelm von Koolwijk	Luftwaffe	Oberst	Commander of Flak-Regiment 37 (motorized) (Note: According to Scherzer as commander of Flak-Regiment 37.)	8 August 1944	—	—
Erwin Koopmann	Heer	Major	Leader of Grenadier-Regiment 76	28 November 1943*	Killed in action 11 November 1943	—
Lothar Kopatzki	Heer	Leutnant	Leader of the Panzer-Jäger-Kompanie 1212	5 April 1945	—	—
Helmut Kopp	Heer	Oberleutnant	Leader of the 1./Grenadier-Regiment 151	2 June 1942	—	—
Karl Kopp	Heer	Feldwebel	Zugführer (platoon leader) in the 11./Infanterie-Regiment 512	15 November 1941	—	—
Walter Kopp	Heer	Hauptmann	Commander of the I./Gebirgsjäger-Regiment 99	6 November 1942	—	—
Walter Kopp	Heer	Major	Leader of Grenadier-Regiment 1077	9 February 1945	—	—
Rudolf Koppe	Heer	Hauptmann	Commander of Panzer-Aufklärungs-Abteilung 23	18 November 1944	—	—
Karl Koppenwallner	Heer	Oberst	Commander of Grenadier-Regiment 97	1 January 1944	—	—
Martin Kordemann? (Note: Martin Kordemann's nomination by his unit was sent to the Heerespersonalamt (HPA—Army Staff Office) as a teleprinter message on 10 May 1945. Major Joachim Domaschk asked the Heeresgruppe C the date of action and the presentation date of the Iron Cross 1st class, which was answered on the same day. Major Domaschk approved the nomination and noted "Knight's Cross yes" without stating a date. There is no evidence of the presentation, which would anyhow have been illegal. The presentation date is an assumption of the Association of Knight's Cross Recipients (AKCR).)	Heer	Oberfeldwebel	Zugführer (platoon leader) in the 6./Grenadier-Regiment 577	11 May 1945	—	—
Dr. rer. pol. Otto Korfes	Heer	Generalmajor	Commander of the 295. Infanterie-Division	22 January 1943	—	—
Heinz Korn	RAD	Feldmeister (rank equivalent to Leutnant)	Meßoffizier (measuring officer) in the 4./schwere Flak-Abteilung 232 (RAD 8/60)	14 January 1945	—	—
Dietrich Kornblum	Luftwaffe	Oberleutnant	Staffelführer of the 4./Kampfgeschwader 53 "Legion Condor"	9 June 1944	—	—
Hans Kornmeyer	Heer	Major	Commander of the II./Infanterie-Regiment 109	9 May 1942	—	—
Franz Kornprobst	Heer	Oberst	Commander of Grenadier-Regiment 320	5 April 1945	—	—
Otto Kornprobst	Heer	Leutnant	Zugführer (platoon leader) of Panzer-Abteilung 118	23 March 1945	—	—
Anton Korol	Luftwaffe	Leutnant of the Reserves	Staffelführer of the 10.(Panzer)/Schlachtgeschwader 2 "Immelmann"	12 March 1945	—	A man wearing a military uniform with an Iron Cross displayed at his neck.
Hans Korte	Luftwaffe	Generalmajor	Commander of the 2.(Torpedo) Flieger-Division (Note: According to Scherzer as commander of the 2. Flieger-Division.)	30 September 1944	—	—
Günther Korten	Luftwaffe	Generalmajor	Chief of the general staff of Luftflotte 4	3 May 1941	—	A smiling man wearing a military uniform and peaked cap.
Claus Korth	Kriegsmarine	Kapitänleutnant	Commander of U-93	29 May 1941	—	—
[Dr.] Siegfried Korth	Waffen-SS	SS-Obersturmführer	Chief of the 3./SS-Kavallerie-Regiment 18 "Florian Geyer" (Note: According to Scherzer as chief of the 3./SS-Kavallerie-Regiment 18.)	9 February 1945	—	—
Gerhard Korthals	Luftwaffe	Hauptmann	Staffelkapitän of the 8./Kampfgeschwader 51	2 October 1942	—	—
Berthold Korts	Luftwaffe	Leutnant	Pilot in the 9./Jagdgeschwader 52	29 August 1943	—	—
Joachim von Kortzfleisch	Heer	General der Infanterie	Commanding general of the XI. Armeekorps	4 September 1940	—	-
Günther Korupkat	Heer	Oberfeldwebel	Deputy leader of the 6./Grenadier-Regiment 1077	9 February 1945	—	—
Karl Kosar	Heer	Leutnant of the Reserves	Zugführer (platoon leader) in the 2./Panzer-Abteilung 7	7 February 1944	—	—
Benno Kosch	Luftwaffe	Oberstleutnant	Gruppenkommandeur of the II./Kampfgeschwader 1 "Hindenburg"	1 October 1940	—	—
Christian Koser	Heer	Oberfeldwebel	Leader of the 4./Grenadier-Regiment 273	2 September 1944	—	—
Dr. Karl Koske	Heer	Generalmajor	Commander of the 212. Infanterie-Division	15 March 1944	—	—
Otto Koslinko (Note: According to Scherzer name is spelled Otto Kislenko.)	Heer	Unteroffizier	Zugführer (platoon leader) in the 8./Grenadier-Regiment 504	4 June 1944*	Killed in action 28 March 1944	—
Siegfried Kossack	Heer	Oberst	Commander of Grenadier-Regiment 1051	18 November 1944	—	—
Georg Koßmala+	Heer	Oberst	Commander of Sicherungs-Regiment 3	13 March 1942	Awarded 435th Oak Leaves 26 March 1944	—
Karl-Richard Koßmann	Heer	Oberst	Commander of Panzergrenadier-Regiment 74	23 March 1945	—	—
Franz Kostka	Heer	Obergefreiter	Shock troops leader in the 6./Grenadier-Regiment 399	10 May 1943	—	—
Franz Kotlowski	Heer	Obergefreiter	Group leader in the 7./Grenadier-Regiment 411	16 November 1944	—	—
Richard Kotz	Heer	Oberst	Commander of Grenadier-Regiment 389	21 October 1943	—	—
Robert Kowalewski	Luftwaffe	Hauptmann	Pilot in the Stabsstaffel/X. Fliegerkorps (Note: According to Scherzer as Ia (operations officer)/X. Fliegerkorps.)	24 November 1940	—	A man wearing a military uniform with an Iron Cross displayed at his neck.
Peter Kox	Heer	Oberfeldwebel	Zugführer (platoon leader) in the 1./Panzer-Jäger-Abteilung 169	5 April 1945	—	—
Boris Kraas	Waffen-SS	SS-Sturmbannführer	Commander of SS-Panzer-Jäger-Abteilung 3 "Totenkopf" (Note: According to Scherzer as commander of SS-Panzer-Jäger-Abteilung 3.)	28 February 1945*	Died of wounds 13 February 1945	—
Hugo Kraas+	Waffen-SS	SS-Sturmbannführer	Commander of the I./2. SS-Panzergrenadier-Regiment/Panzergrenadier-Division "Leibstandarte SS Adolf Hitler" (Note: According to Scherzer as commander of the I./2. SS-Panzergrenadier-Regiment "Leibstandarte SS Adolf Hitler".)	28 March 1943	Awarded 375th Oak Leaves 24 January 1944	—
Hermann Kracht	Heer	Oberfeldwebel	Zugführer (platoon leader) in the 12.(MG)/Grenadier-Regiment 29 (motorized) (Note: According to Scherzer as Zugführer (platoon leader) in the 12./Grenadier-Regiment (motorized) 29.)	25 December 1944*	Killed in action 2 June 1944	—
Christoph Krämer	Heer	Oberfeldwebel	Zugführer (platoon leader) in the 5./Panzergrenadier-Regiment 7	14 May 1944	—	—
Fritz Kraemer	Heer	Oberstleutnant im General (in the General Staff)	Ia (operations officer) in the 13. Panzer-Division	17 December 1942	—	
Paul Krämer	Heer	Oberstleutnant	Commander of Panzergrenadier-Regiment 93	7 February 1945	—	—
Richard Krämer	Heer	Leutnant	Zugführer (platoon leader) in the 1./Sturmgeschütz-Brigade 232	30 September 1944	—	—
Oskar Kräussel	Luftwaffe	Feldwebel	Pilot in Kampfgruppe z.b.V. 172	24 December 1942 (Note: According to Scherzer on 23 December 1942.)	—	—
Heinrich Krafft	Luftwaffe	Oberleutnant of the Reserves (Note: According to Scherzer as Oberleutnant.)	Staffelkapitän of the 3./Jagdgeschwader 51 "Mölders"	18 March 1942	—	—
[Dr.] Horst Krafft	Heer	Oberleutnant	Chief of the 2./Sturmgeschütz-Abteilung 185	29 September 1941	—	—
Alfred Kraft	Heer	Unteroffizier	Zugführer (platoon leader) in the 2./Panzer-Regiment 27	22 January 1943	—	—
Gerhard Kraft	Heer	Hauptmann	Commander of the I./Panzergrenadier-Regiment 112	23 February 1944	—	—
Josef Kraft+	Luftwaffe	Oberleutnant	Pilot in the II./Nachtjagdgeschwader 6 (Note: According to Scherzer as pilot in the 7./Nachtjagdgeschwader 6.)	30 September 1944	Awarded 838th Oak Leaves 17 April 1945	—
Karl Kraft	Heer	Major	Commander of the I./Infanterie-Regiment 42	18 January 1942	—	—
Ernst Krag+	Waffen-SS	SS-Sturmbannführer	Commander of SS-Panzer-Aufklärungs-Abteilung 2 "Das Reich" (Note: According to Scherzer as commander of SS-Panzer-Aufklärungs-Abteilung 2.)	23 October 1944	Awarded 755th Oak Leaves 28 February 1945	—
Hans Krah	Heer	Major	Commander of the I./Füsilier-Regiment 34	11 October 1943	—	—
Karl-Heinz Krahl	Luftwaffe	Hauptmann	Leader of the I./Jagdgeschwader 2 "Richthofen"	13 November 1940	—	
Walter Krainz	Heer	Obergefreiter	In the III./Jäger-Regiment 75	17 April 1945	—	—
Dietrich Kraiss+	Heer	Generalmajor	Commander of the 168. Infanterie-Division	23 July 1942	Awarded 549th Oak Leaves 11 August 1944	A man wearing a military uniform with an Iron Cross displayed at the front of his uniform collar.
August Krakau	Heer	Oberst	Commander of Gebirgsjäger-Regiment 85	21 June 1941	—	
Rupprecht Kral	Heer	Unteroffizier	Geschützführer (gun layer) in the 14.(Panzerjäger)/Grenadier-Regiment 19 (Note: According to Scherzer as Geschützführer (gun layer) in the 14./Grenadier-Regiment 19.)	15 May 1944	—	—
Friedrich Kralemann	Luftwaffe	Oberfeldwebel	Pilot in the II./Kampfgeschwader 3 "Lützow"	29 October 1943	—	—
Heinz Kramer	Heer	Unteroffizier	Richtschütze (gunner) in the 2./schwere Panzer-Abteilung 502	6 October 1944	—	
Rudolf Kramer	Luftwaffe	Hauptmann	Staffelkapitän in Kampfgeschwader 26	18 March 1945	—	—
Theodor Krancke+	Kriegsmarine	Kapitän zur See	Commander of heavy cruiser Admiral Scheer	21 February 1941	Awarded 614th Oak Leaves 18 October 1944	
Wolfgang van Kranenbrock	Heer	Hauptmann	Commander of the II./Infanterie-Regiment 102	25 September 1942	—	—
Bernhard Kranz	Heer	Oberleutnant of the Reserves	Chief of the 15./Jäger-Regiment 83 (Note: According to Scherzer as chief of the 15. and leader of the III./Jäger-Regiment 83.)	5 November 1944	—	—
Rudolf Kranz	Heer	Major	Commander of Sturmgeschütz-Brigade 249	23 October 1944	—	—
Günther Krappe	Heer	Generalleutnant	Commander of the 61. Infanterie-Division	11 April 1944	—	—
Heinrich Krappmann	Luftwaffe	Obergefreiter	Geschützkanonier (gunner) in the 19./Fallschirm-Panzer-Flak-Regiment "Hermann Göring" (Note: According to Scherzer as Geschützkanonier (gunner) in the 19./Fallschirm-Flak-Regiment "Hermann Göring".)	28 February 1945	—	—
Dr. Günther Kratsch	Heer	Major	Commander of the I./Artillerie-Regiment 65 (motorized) (Note: According to Scherzer as commander of the I.(motorized)/Artillerie-Regiment 65.)	29 September 1940	—	—
Hans Kratzenberg	Heer	Major	Commander of the III./Schützen-Regiment 3	15 August 1940	—	—
Rudolf Kratzert	Luftwaffe	Hauptmann (Note: According to Scherzer as Hauptmann zur Verwendung (for disposition).)	Commander of the III./Fallschirmjäger-Regiment 3	9 June 1944	—	A man wearing a military uniform with an Iron Cross displayed at his neck.
Adolf Kraus	Luftwaffe	Oberfeldwebel	Pilot in the 4./Kampfgeschwader 1 "Hindenburg"	25 November 1942*	Killed in action 30 September 1942	—
Eduard Kraus	Heer	Oberleutnant of the Reserves	Leader of the 6./Panzergrenadier-Regiment 14	25 January 1943	—	—
Ewald Kraus	Heer	Major	Deputy leader of Panzer-Artillerie-Regiment 102	26 March 1944	—	—
Hans-Werner Kraus	Kriegsmarine	Kapitänleutnant	Commander of U-83	19 June 1942	—	—
Rupert Kraus	Luftwaffe	Oberleutnant	Leader of the 2./Fallschirm-Panzer-Regiment 1 "Hermann Göring" (Note: According to Scherzer as Kompanieführer (company leader) in the I./Fallschirm-Panzer-Regiment "Hermann Göring".)	30 September 1944	—	—
Bernhard Krause	Waffen-SS	SS-Sturmbannführer	Commander of the I./SS-Panzergrenadier-Regiment 26 "Hitlerjugend" (Note: According to Scherzer as commander of the I./SS-Panzergrenadier-Regiment 26.)	18 November 1944	—	—
Fritz Krause	Luftwaffe	Oberst	Commander of Flak-Regiment 91 (motorized) (Note: According to Scherzer as commander of Flak-Regiment 91.)	24 March 1943*	Killed in action 25 January 1943	—
Johannes Krause	Luftwaffe	Hauptmann	Gruppenkommandeur of the II./Nachtjagdgeschwader 101	7 February 1945	—	—
Max Krause	Heer	Major	Leader of Grenadier-Regiment 106	18 November 1944	—	—
Richard Krause	Heer	Hauptmann	Commander of the II./Grenadier-Regiment 848	4 May 1944	—	—
Walther Krause	Heer	Generalmajor	Commander of the 170. Infanterie-Division	10 June 1943	—	—
Bernhard Krauss (Note: According to Scherzer name is spelled Bernhard Kraus who received the Knight's Cross of the Iron Cross as Zugführer (platoon leader) in the 2./Panzer-Jäger-Abteilung 128.)	Heer	Unteroffizier	Infanteriegeschütz (infantry gun) leader in the 2./Panzer-Jäger-Abteilung 128	9 January 1945	—	—
Oswald Krauss	Waffen-SS	SS-Sturmbannführer	Leader of SS-Kavallerie-Regiment 15 "Florian Geyer" (Note: According to Scherzer as leader of SS-Kavallerie-Regiment 15.)	27 January 1945	—	—
Walter Krauß+	Luftwaffe	Oberleutnant	Pilot in the 2.(H)/Aufklärungs-Gruppe 21	29 July 1940	Awarded 363rd Oak Leaves 3 January 1944	—
Erich Krebs	Luftwaffe	Hauptmann	Chief of the 1./Flak-Regiment 11 (motorized) (Note: According to Scherzer on 14 February 1942 as chief of the 1./Flak-Regiment 11.)	16 February 1942	—	—
Günther-Wolfgang Krebs	Heer	Leutnant	Leader of a Kampfgruppe in the Heeres-Gebirgsjäger-Bataillon 201 (Note: According to Scherzer as leader of the 2./Hochgebirgsjäger-Bataillon 201, killed in action on 19 December 1944.)	26 December 1944*	Killed in action 14 December 1944	—
Hans Krebs+	Heer	Generalleutnant	Chief of the general staff of Heeresgruppe Mitte	26 March 1944	Awarded 749th Oak Leaves 20 February 1945	A man wearing a military uniform and peaked cap with an Iron Cross displayed at the front of his uniform collar.
Günther Krech	Kriegsmarine	Kapitänleutnant	Commander of U-558	17 September 1942	—	—
Werner Krei	Heer	Oberfähnrich	Zugführer (platoon leader) in the 5./Panzer-Aufklärungs-Abteilung 19	10 February 1944	—	—
Herbert Kreiner	Heer	Hauptmann	Battalion commander in Grenadier-Regiment 261 (Note: According to Scherzer as battalion commander in the I./Grenadier-Regiment 261.)	28 January 1943	—	—
Heinrich Kreipe	Heer	Oberstleutnant	Commander of Infanterie-Regiment 209	13 October 1941	—	—
Rudolf Kreitmair	Heer	Hauptmann of the Reserves	Leader of the 7./Grenadier-Regiment 282	31 March 1943	—	—
Günther Krekow	Heer	Leutnant	Battery officer in Artillerie-Regiment 6 (Note: According to Scherzer as battery officer in 11./Artillerie-Regiment 6 (L).)	6 November 1944	—	—
[Dr.] Hermann Kremer	Heer	Major of the Reserves	Commander of the II./Artillerie-Regiment 129	23 March 1945	—	—
Gerhard Krems	Luftwaffe	Leutnant	Pilot in the 2./Kampfgeschwader 27 "Boelcke"	25 May 1942	—	—
Wilhelm Krenz	Heer	Feldwebel	Zugführer (platoon leader) in the 3./Divisions-Füsilier-Bataillon 96	4 May 1944	—	—
Hermann Krenzer	Heer	Oberleutnant (Note: According to Scherzer as Oberleutnant of the Reserves.)	Chief of the 2./Infanterie-Regiment 379	14 December 1941	—	—
Hermann Kreß	Heer	Oberst	Commander of Gebirgsjäger-Regiment 99	20 December 1941	—	—
Ulrich Kreß	Heer	Leutnant of the Reserves	Zugführer (platoon leader) in the 1./Aufklärungs-Abteilung 20	22 September 1941	—	—
[Prof. Dr.] Ludwig-Hilmar Kresse (Note: The brackets around the professor and doctor title [Prof. Dr.] denotes that the academic title was attained after the Knight's Cross of the Iron Cross was awarded.)	Heer	Major of the Reserves	Commander of Feld-Ersatz-Bataillon 94	18 November 1944	—	—
Wilhelm Kressel	Heer	Leutnant of the Reserves	Leader of the 5./Sturm-Regiment of Panzer AOK 4	16 October 1944	—	—
Erwin Kreßmann	Heer	Hauptmann	Chief of the 1./schwere Panzer-Jäger-Abteilung 519	9 December 1944	—	—
Franz Kretschmer	Heer	Leutnant of the Reserves	Zugführer (platoon leader) in the I./schwere Panzer-Jäger-Abteilung 656 (Note: According to Scherzer as chief of the 1./schwere Panzer-Jäger-Abteilung 656.)	17 December 1943	—	—
Otto Kretschmer+	Kriegsmarine	Kapitänleutnant	Commander of U-99	4 August 1940	Awarded 6th Oak Leaves 4 November 1940; 5th Swords 26 December 1941	The head and shoulders of a smiling young man. He wears casual army fatigues and is unshaven.
Theodor Kretschmer	Heer	Oberst	Leader of the 17. Panzer-Division	8 March 1945	—	—
Heinz Krettek	Heer	Leutnant of the Reserves	Leader of the 5./Grenadier-Regiment 423	12 August 1944	—	—
Wolfgang Kretzschmar+	Heer	Major	Commander of Grenadier-Bataillon 540 z.b.V.	15 May 1943	Awarded 600th Oak Leaves 30 September 1944; 121st Swords 12 January 1945	—
Karl Kreutz+	Waffen-SS	SS-Standartenführer	Commander of SS-Panzer-Artillerie-Regiment 2 "Das Reich" (Note: According to Scherzer as commander of SS-Panzer-Artillerie-Regiment 2.)	27 August 1944	Awarded (863rd) Oak Leaves 6 May 1945? (Note: No evidence of the award can be found in the German Federal Archives. The award was unlawfully presented by SS-Oberstgruppenführer Sepp Dietrich. The date is taken from the announcement made by the 6. SS-Panzerarmee. The sequential number "863" was assigned by the Association of Knight's Cross Recipients (AKCR). Karl Kreutz was member of the AKCR.)	—
Anton Kreutzberg	Heer	Unteroffizier	Geschützführer (gun layer) in the 2./schwere Panzer-Jäger-Abteilung 525	21 September 1944	—	—
Dr. Eduard Kreuzer	Heer	Oberstleutnant	Commander of Jäger-Regiment 24 (L)	17 March 1945*	Killed in action 22 February 1945	—
Franz Kreuzer	Heer	Unteroffizier	Group leader in the 3./Grenadier-Regiment 89	15 January 1943	—	—
Othmar Kreuzinger+	Heer	Oberleutnant of the Reserves	Chief of the 4./Panzer-Aufklärungs-Abteilung 19	14 May 1944	Awarded 625th Oak Leaves 18 October 1944	—
Heinz Krey	Kriegsmarine	Leutnant (Ing.)	Chief engineer on U-752	4 September 1943*	Killed in action 23 May 1943	—
Hermann Krey	Heer	Fahnenjunker-Wachtmeister	Zugführer (platoon leader) in the 2./Divisions-Füsilier-Bataillon 30	17 September 1944	—	—
Hans Kreysing+	Heer	Oberst	Commander of Infanterie-Regiment 16	18 May 1940 (Note: According to Scherzer on 29 May 1940.)	Awarded 183rd Oak Leaves 20 January 1943; 63rd Swords 13 April 1944	A black-and-white photograph of a man in semi profile wearing a military uniform and a neck order in shape of an Iron Cross.
Karl Kriebel	Heer	Generalmajor	Commander of the 56. Infanterie-Division	4 July 1940	—	
Gerhard Krieg	Heer	Oberwachtmeister	Zugführer (platoon leader) in the 1./Heeres-Sturmgeschütz-Brigade 243	28 March 1945	—	—
Harald Krieg	Heer	Oberleutnant	Chief of the 4./Schützen-Regiment 1	15 July 1941	—	—
Johann-Otto Krieg	Kriegsmarine	Oberleutnant zur See	Chief of the Kleinkampfmittel-Flottille 361	8 July 1944	—	—
Friedrich-Wilhelm Krieger	Heer	Hauptmann	Commander of the II./Grenadier-Regiment 87	7 September 1943*	Died of wounds 1 September 1943	—
Werner Krieger	Heer	Major	Commander of the I./Grenadier-Regiment 17	31 October 1944	—	—
Wilhelm Krieger	Heer	Feldwebel	Zugführer (platoon leader) in the 1./Grenadier-Regiment 168	4 June 1944	—	—
Herbert Kriening	Heer	Feldwebel	Zugführer (platoon leader) in the 12.(MG)/Grenadier-Regiment 234 (Note: According to Scherzer as Zugführer (platoon leader) in the 12./Grenadier-Regiment 234.)	23 August 1943	—	
Josef Krings	Heer	Oberfeldwebel	Kompanietruppführer (company headquarters leader) in the 2./Grenadier-Regiment 412	4 May 1944	—	—
Heinz Krink	Luftwaffe	Leutnant	Adjutant in the II./Fallschirmjäger-Regiment 3	9 June 1944	—	—
Helmut Kroeg	Heer	Oberleutnant	Leader of the II./Grenadier-Regiment 45	28 March 1945	—	—
Wilhelm Kröhne	Heer	Major	Commander of the Sturmgeschütz-Brigade 190 (Note: According to Scherzer as commander of the leichte Sturmgeschütz-Brigade 190.)	24 February 1945	—	—
Otto Krogmann	Heer	Unteroffizier	Zugführer (platoon leader) in the 1./Infanterie-Regiment 668	9 November 1942	—	—
Hans Kroh+	Luftwaffe	Major	Commander of the I./Fallschirmjäger-Regiment 2	21 August 1941	Awarded 443rd Oak Leaves 6 April 1944; 96th Swords 12 September 1944	A man wearing a military uniform with an Iron Cross displayed at the front of his uniform collar.
Ernst Krohn	Heer	Oberfeldwebel	Zugführer (platoon leader) in the 1./Grenadier-Regiment 505	27 October 1943	—	—
Hans Krohn	Heer	Gefreiter	Richtschütze (gunner) in the 1./Panzer-Jäger-Abteilung 20	6 April 1942	—	—
Hans Krohn	Luftwaffe	Oberfeldwebel	Radio operator in the 6./Sturzkampfgeschwader 2 "Immelmann"	26 March 1944	—	—
Theo Kroj	Heer	Hauptmann (Note: According to Scherzer as Hauptmann of the Reserves.)	Leader of the II./Grenadier-Regiment 87	24 November 1943	—	—
Hermann Kroll	Luftwaffe	Oberfeldwebel	Pilot in the 7.(F)/Lehrgeschwader 2	5 April 1942	—	—
Franz-Josef Krombholz	Waffen-SS	SS-Hauptsturmführer (Note: According to Scherzer as SS-Hauptsturmführer of the Reserves and commander of the III./SS-Freiwilligen-Gebirgsjäger-Regiment 14.)	Commander of the III./SS-Freiwilligen-Gebirgsjäger-Regiment 14 "Prinz Eugen"	28 March 1945	—	—
Otto Kron	Waffen-SS	SS-Hauptsturmführer	Leader of the SS-Flak-Abteilung "Totenkopf" (Note: According to Scherzer as leader of the Flak-Abteilung SS-"Totenkopf"-Division.)	28 June 1942	—	—
Max-Georg Kroner	Heer	Hauptmann	Commander of the III./Grenadier-Regiment 463	17 October 1943	—	—
Fritz Kropp	Heer	Unteroffizier	Group leader in the 2./Grenadier-Regiment 48	12 March 1944	—	—
Hans-Joachim Kroschinski	Luftwaffe	Oberfeldwebel	Pilot in the 3./Jagdgeschwader 54	17 April 1945	—	—
Heinz Kroseberg	Luftwaffe	Hauptmann of the Reserves	Staffelkapitän of the Wüstennotstaffel (emergency desert squadron)	19 June 1942	Missing in action 12 May 1942	—
Dedo von Krosigk	Heer	Hauptmann	Chief of the 1./Infanterie-Regiment 51 (motorized)	15 May 1942	—	—
Ernst-Anton von Krosigk+	Heer	Generalmajor	Commander of the 1. Infanterie-Division	12 February 1944	Awarded 827th Oak Leaves 12 April 1945	
Kurt Kruck	Heer	Oberleutnant	Chief of the 4./Divisions-Füsilier-Bataillon 96	20 October 1944	—	—
[Prof. Dr.] Fritz Krück	Heer	Oberleutnant	Leader of the II./Grenadier-Regiment 226	5 March 1945	—	—
Ernst-Felix Krüder+	Kriegsmarine	Kapitän zur See	Commander of auxiliary cruiser Pinguin (HSK 5)	22 December 1940	Awarded 40th Oak Leaves 15 November 1941	—
Albrecht Krügel+	Waffen-SS	SS-Sturmbannführer	Commander of the II./SS-Freiwilligen-Panzergrenadier-Regiment 23 "Norge" (Note: According to Scherzer as commander of the II./SS-Panzergrenadier-Regiment "Norge" (Norwegian Nr. 1).)	12 March 1944	Awarded 651st Oak Leaves 16 November 1944	—
Erwin Krüger	Heer	Oberfähnrich	Spähtruppführer (reconnaissance patrol leader) in the Panzer-Späh-Schwadron/Panzer-Aufklärungs-Abteilung 24 (Note: According to Scherzer as Spähtruppführer (reconnaissance patrol leader) in the Panzer-Späh-Schwadron 24.)	17 September 1944	—	—
Felix Krüger	Heer	Oberfeldwebel	Spähtruppführer (reconnaissance patrol leader) in the Stabskompanie/Panzer-Aufklärungs-Abteilung 6	9 December 1944	—	—
Friedrich Krüger	Waffen-SS	SS-Obergruppenführer and General of the Waffen-SS and Police	Commander of the 6. SS-Gebirgs-Division "Nord"	22 October 1944	—	
Fritz Krüger	Heer	Stabswachtmeister	Battery officer in the 1./Artillerie-Regiment 37	17 March 1945	—	—
Hans-Heinrich Krüger	Heer	Major im Generalstab (in the General Staff) (Note: According to Scherzer as Major assigned to General Staff training with Stab/321. Infanterie-Division and leader of a Kampfgruppe of the 321. Infanterie-Division.)	Leader of a Kampfgruppe in the 321. Infanterie-Division	3 December 1943	—	—
Helmut Krüger	Heer	Hauptmann of the Reserves	Commander of the I./Grenadier-Regiment 151	11 April 1944	—	—
Horst Krüger	Luftwaffe	Oberleutnant	Observer in the 3./Nacht-Aufklärungs-Staffel (Note: According to Scherzer as observer in the Aufklärungsstaffel 3.(F)/Nacht.)	4 November 1941	—	—
Joachim Krüger	Waffen-SS	SS-Untersturmführer	Leader of the 10./SS-Panzergrenadier-Regiment 4 "Der Führer"	24 June 1944*	Died of wounds 14 August 1943	—
Kurt Krüger	Heer	Leutnant of the Reserves	Zugführer (platoon leader) in the Panzer-Abteilung 8	7 February 1944	—	—
Kurt Krüger	Heer	Oberwachtmeister	Battery officer in the 2./Artillerie-Regiment 156	31 July 1943*	Died of wounds 12 July 1943	—
Rudolf Krüger	Heer	Oberfeldwebel	Zugführer (platoon leader) of the 6./Infanterie-Regiment 32	5 October 1941	—	A colour photograph of a man wearing a military uniform with an Iron Cross displayed at his neck.
Walter Krüger+	Heer	Generalmajor	Commander of the 1. Schützen-Brigade	15 July 1941	Awarded 373rd Oak Leaves 24 January 1944	
Walter Krüger+	Waffen-SS	SS-Brigadeführer and Generalmajor of the Waffen-SS	Commander of the SS-Polizei-Division	13 December 1941	Awarded 286th Oak Leaves 31 August 1943; 120th Swords 11 January 1945	
Walther Krüger	Heer	Oberstleutnant	Commander of Panzergrenadier-Regiment 71 (Note: According to Scherzer as commander of Grenadier-Regiment (motorized) 71.)	27 August 1943	—	—
Friedrich-Karl Krützmann	Heer	Hauptmann	Commander of the I./Panzergrenadier-Regiment 5	3 March 1944	—	—
Leopold Krugner	Heer	Unteroffizier	Geschützführer (gun layer) in the 1./Panzer-Jäger-Abteilung 17	14 February 1945	—	—
Hans Krumminga	Luftwaffe	Leutnant	Pilot in the 9./Sturzkampfgeschwader 2 "Immelmann"	19 September 1943	—	—
Walter Krupinski+	Luftwaffe	Leutnant	Pilot in the 6./Jagdgeschwader 52	29 October 1942	Awarded 415th Oak Leaves 2 March 1944	
Ernst Kruse+	Heer	Oberfeldwebel	Zugführer (platoon leader) in the 7./Panzergrenadier-Regiment 3	6 October 1942	Awarded 245th Oak Leaves 17 May 1943	—
Gerhard Kruse+	Heer	Hauptmann of the Reserves	Leader of the I./Grenadier-Regiment 48	23 February 1944	Awarded 534th Oak Leaves 27 July 1944	—
Heinrich Kruse	Heer	Hauptmann	Leader of Grenadier-Regiments Gruppe 311 (Note: According to Scherzer as commander of Grenadier-Regiments Gruppe 311.)	26 March 1944	—	—
Heinz Kruse	Heer	Feldwebel	Zugführer (platoon leader) in the schwere Panzer-Abteilung 655 (Note: According to Scherzer as Zugführer (platoon leader) in the schwere Panzer-Jäger-Abteilung 655.)	23 March 1945	—	—
Gustav Krutemeier	Heer	Oberfeldwebel	Zugführer (platoon leader) in the 1./Gebirgs-Pionier-Bataillon 99	3 October 1942	—	—
Johann Ksiag	Heer	Feldwebel	Zugführer (platoon leader) in the 2./Panzer-Jäger-Abteilung 176	15 January 1943	—	—
Wilhelm Kubel	Heer	Hauptmann of the Reserves	Leader of the II./Grenadier-Regiment 162	30 September 1944	—	—
Walter Kubisch	Luftwaffe	Oberfeldwebel	Radio/wireless operator in Nachtjagdgeschwader 3 (Note: According to Scherzer as radio/wireless operator in the Stab/Nachtjagdgeschwader 3.)	31 December 1943	—	—
Jakob Kuchar? (Note: Jakob Kuchar's nomination by his unit was received by the Heerespersonalamt (HPA—Army Staff Office) on 11 April 1945. Major approved the nomination on 12 April 1945. A Heerespersonalamt-Verleihungsvorschlag (HPA-VV—Army Staff Office Nomination Recommendation) Nr. 5085 was created on 19 April. According to the file card, this HPA-VV was forwarded for approval. No further information regarding the approval or presentation of the Knight's Cross is indicated. The presentation date is an assumption of the Association of Knight's Cross Recipients (AKCR).)	Heer	Gefreiter	In the 8./Jäger-Regiment 228	11 May 1945	—	—
Ludwig Kübler	Heer	Generalmajor	Commander of the 1. Gebirgs-Division	27 October 1939	—	A grim looking man wearing a peaked cap and a military uniform with an Iron Cross displayed at his neck.
Georg von Küchler+	Heer	General der Artillerie	Commander-in-chief of the 3. Armee	30 September 1939	Awarded 273rd Oak Leaves 21 August 1943	Black-and-white portrait of an older man wearing a peaked cap, military uniform with an Iron Cross displayed at his neck.
Dr. jur. Ernst Kühl+	Luftwaffe	Oberst of the Reserves (Note: According to Scherzer as Oberstleutnant of the Reserves.)	Geschwaderkommodore of Kampfgeschwader 55	17 October 1942	Awarded 356th Oak Leaves 18 December 1943	
Hermann Kühl	Luftwaffe	Hauptmann	Staffelkapitän of the 2./Kampfgeschwader 4 "General Wever"	24 November 1940	—	—
Kurt Kühme	Heer	Major	Commander of Sturmgeschütz-Brigade 280	9 December 1944	—	—
Friedrich Kühn	Heer	Generalmajor	Commander of the 3. Panzer-Brigade	4 July 1940	—	—
Hans-Jochen Kühn	Heer	Leutnant of the Reserves	Chief of the 9./Panzer-Regiment 36	12 January 1944	—	—
Martin Kühne	Luftwaffe	Hauptmann	Commander of the I./Fallschirmjäger-Regiment 2	29 February 1944	—	—
[Dr.] Rudolf Kühnfels	Heer	Oberleutnant	Company chief in Jäger-Regiment 54	9 December 1944	—	—
Johannes Kümmel+	Heer	Oberleutnant	Chief of the 1./Panzer-Regiment 8	9 July 1941	Awarded 133rd Oak Leaves 11 October 1942	—
Otto Kümmling	Heer	Unteroffizier	Group leader in the 6./Grenadier-Regiment 530	4 May 1944	—	—
Herbert Kündiger+	Heer	Major	Commander of the I./Grenadier-Regiment 978	9 December 1944	Awarded 708th Oak Leaves 21 January 1945	—
Christian Künkel	Luftwaffe	Leutnant	Pilot in the 8./Sturzkampfgeschwader 3	26 March 1944*	Killed in action 27 January 1944	—
Heinz Künnecke	Heer	Oberleutnant	Chief of the 2./Infanterie-Bataillon z.b.V. 500	16 November 1943	—	—
Heino Reichsfreiherr von Künsberg-Weidenberg	Heer	Oberstleutnant	Commander of Grenadier-Regiment 188	16 September 1943	—	—
Hans-Joachim Künzel	Heer	Oberleutnant	Leader of the 3./Schützen-Regiment 10	22 September 1941	—	—
Karl-Friedrich Künzel	Kriegsmarine	Oberleutnant zur See	Group leader and commander of Schnellboot S-28 in the 1. Schnellbootflottille	12 December 1943	—	—
Hans Kürsten	Heer	Leutnant of the Reserves	Zugführer (platoon leader) in the 1./Panzer-Regiment 7	11 October 1941	—	—
Alfred Küsel	Heer	Rittmeister	Commander of the I./Grenadier-Regiment 4	12 December 1944	—	—
Karl Küspert	Heer	Hauptmann	Chief of the 1./Panzer-Regiment 35	16 October 1944	—	—
Ferdinand Kuester	Heer	Oberleutnant	Chief of the 1./Grenadier-Regiment 58	27 October 1943	—	—
Heinz Küster	Heer	Leutnant	Leader of the 5./Grenadier-Regiment 108	15 July 1943	—	—
Rudolf Küster	Luftwaffe	Oberleutnant	Pilot in the 6./Kampfgeschwader 53 "Legion Condor"	17 March 1945	—	—
Wilhelm Küster	Luftwaffe	Oberleutnant	Pilot in Wettererkundungsstaffel 26 (6.(F)/Aufklärungs-Gruppe 122) (Note: According to Scherzer as Staffelkapitän of the Wettererkundungsstaffel 26.)	18 May 1943	—	—
Andreas Kuffner+	Luftwaffe	Oberleutnant	Staffelführer of the 4./Sturzkampfgeschwader 2 "Immelmann" (Note: According to Scherzer as pilot in the I./Sturzkampfgeschwader 2 "Immelmann".)	16 April 1943	Awarded 684th Oak Leaves 20 December 1944	—
Otto Kugelstadt	Heer	Feldwebel	Zugführer (platoon leader) in the 6./Grenadier-Regiment 485	26 December 1944	—	—
Eugen Kugler	Heer	Hauptmann of the Reserves	Leader of the I./Grenadier-Regiment 19 "List"	5 April 1945	—	—
Josef Kugler	Heer	Unteroffizier	Group leader in the 9./Grenadier-Regiment 200 (motorized)	3 November 1944	—	—
Helmut Kuhenne	Luftwaffe	Oberfeldwebel (Note: According to Scherzer on 24 January 1945 as Feldwebel.)	Radio operator in the Stab/Fernaufklärungs-Gruppe 3	20 January 1945	—	—
Josef Kuher	Heer	Oberwachtmeister	Battery officer and Vorgeschobener Beobachter (forward observer) in the 7./schweres Werfer-Regiment 3 (motorized)	9 May 1945 (Note: According to Scherzer on 5 March 1945.)	—	—
Herbert Kuhlmann	Waffen-SS	SS-Sturmbannführer	Commander of the I./SS-Panzer-Regiment 1 "Leibstandarte SS Adolf Hitler"	13 February 1944	—	—
Kurt Kuhlmey	Luftwaffe	Hauptmann	Gruppenkommandeur of the II./Sturzkampfgeschwader 3	15 July 1942	—	—
Wilhelm Kuhlwilm	Luftwaffe	Oberleutnant	Company leader in the Fallschirm-Panzergrenadier-Regiment 3 "Hermann Göring"	30 November 1944	—	—
Karl Kuhn	Heer	Hauptmann	Leader of a Rückkampfgruppe "Kuhn" (formerly Grenadier-Regiment 81)	26 November 1944	—	—
Otto Kuhn	Heer	Oberleutnant of the Reserves	Chief of the 5./Panzergrenadier-Regiment 13	7 March 1943	—	—
Walter Kuhn	Heer	Obergefreiter	Richtschütze (gunner) in the 3./Panzer-Jäger-Abteilung 1	23 August 1943	—	—
Bernhard Kuhna	Heer	Oberleutnant (Note: According to Scherzer as Oberleutnant of the Reserves.)	Leader of the II./Infanterie-Regiment 508	12 January 1942	—	—
Alfred Kuhnert	Heer	Oberst	Commander of Grenadier-Regiment 51 (motorized)	20 April 1944	—	—
Manfred Kuhnert	Heer	Gefreiter	Richtschütze (gunner) in the 14.(Panzerjäger)/Grenadier-Regiment 442 (Note: According to Scherzer as Richtschütze (gunner) in the 14./Grenadier-Regiment 442.)	22 January 1944	—	—
Günter Kuhnke	Kriegsmarine	Kapitänleutnant	Commander of U-28	19 September 1940	—	
Theophil Kuhnle	Heer	Hauptmann (Note: According to Scherzer as Hauptmann of the Reserves.)	Chief of Sturmgeschütz-Kompanie 1014	18 February 1945	—	—
Norbert Kujacinski	Heer	Hauptmann of the Reserves	Chief of the 4./Panzer-Regiment 23	18 November 1944	—	—
Arthur Kullmer+	Heer	Generalleutnant	Commander of the 296. Infanterie-Division	27 October 1943	Awarded 758th Oak Leaves 28 February 1945	—
Josef Kulot	Heer	Obergefreiter	Group leader in the 6./Infanterie-Regiment 60 (motorized)	24 September 1942	—	
Karl Kulp	Luftwaffe	Feldwebel	Zugführer (platoon leader) in the 13./Fallschirm-Panzergrenadier-Regiment 4 "Hermann Göring" (Note: According to Scherzer as Zugführer (platoon leader) in the 13./Fallschirm-Panzergrenadier-Regiment 1 "Hermann Göring".)	5 September 1944	—	—
[Prof. Dr.] Wolfgang Kuls	Heer	Rittmeister	Commander of the III./Panzer-Regiment 24	24 February 1945	—	—
Josef Kult+	Heer	Leutnant of the Reserves	Leader of the 3./Jäger-Regiment 228	7 October 1942	Awarded 212th Oak Leaves 15 March 1943	—
Otto Kumm+	Waffen-SS	SS-Obersturmbannführer	Commander of SS-Infanterie-Regiment (motorized) "Der Führer" (Note: According to Scherzer as commander of SS-Regiment (motorized) "Der Führer".)	16 February 1942	Awarded 221st Oak Leaves 6 April 1943; 138th Swords 17 March 1945	Black-and-white photo of a man wearing a peaked cap, military uniform with an Iron Cross displayed at his neck.
Alfred Kummer	Luftwaffe	Fahnenjunker-Oberfeldwebel	Pilot in the 11./Transportgeschwader 2	18 November 1944	—	—
Gotthard Kummer	Heer	Feldwebel	Zugführer (platoon leader) in the 1./Grenadier-Regiment 45	11 March 1943	—	—
Oskar Kummetz	Kriegsmarine	Konteradmiral	Leader of Kampfgruppe Oslo	18 January 1941	—	A man wearing a peaked cap and black naval uniform with an Iron Cross displayed at his neck.
Gerhard Kunert+	Heer	Obergefreiter	Group leader of the 6./Panzergrenadier-Regiment 33	16 September 1943	Awarded 606th Oak Leaves 4 October 1944	—
Hans Kunert	Heer	Leutnant of the Reserves	Vorgeschobener Beobachter (forward observer) in the 4./Artillerie-Regiment 5	23 August 1944	—	—
Rudolf Kunert	Heer	Hauptmann of the Reserves	Leader of the II./Grenadier-Regiment 401	21 September 1944	—	—
Kurt-Ernst Kunkel? (Note: No evidence of the award can be found in the German Federal Archives. The award was unlawfully presented by the commanding general of the I Parachute Corps, General der Fallschirmtruppe Richard Heidrich.)	Luftwaffe	Leutnant	Company chief in the 2./Fallschirmjäger-Regiment 4	30 April 1945	—	—
Rolf Kunkel	Heer	Major	Commander of Divisions-Füsilier-Bataillon 26	17 March 1945*	Killed in action 29 November 1944	—
Erwin Kunsch	Heer	Hauptmann	Commander of the II./Grenadier-Regiment 232	24 November 1943*	Died of wounds 28 September 1943	—
Albert Kuntz	Heer	Hauptmann	Leader of Panzer-Aufklärungs-Abteilung 2	6 February 1944	—	—
Herbert Kuntz	Luftwaffe	Leutnant of the Reserves (Note: According to Scherzer as Leutnant (war officer).)	Pilot in the 3./Kampfgeschwader 100	14 March 1943	—	—
Albrecht Kuntze	Luftwaffe	Oberleutnant	Pilot in the 6./Kampfgeschwader 26	16 May 1940	—	—
Walter Kuntze	Heer	General der Pioniere	Commanding general of the XXXXII. Armeekorps	18 October 1941	—	
Adolf-Friedrich Kuntzen	Heer	Generalleutnant	Commander of the 8. Panzer-Division	3 June 1940	—	—
Hermann Kunz	Heer	Leutnant	Zugführer (platoon leader) in the 2./Panzer-Jäger-Abteilung 37	17 December 1943	—	—
Karl Kunz	Heer	Oberst	Commander of Grenadier-Regiment 412	6 April 1944*	Died of wounds 31 January 1944	—
[Dr.] Rudolf Kunz	Heer	Oberleutnant of the Reserves	Leader of Schnelle Abteilung 306	10 June 1943	—	—
Erhard Kunze	Heer	Oberfeldwebel	Zugführer (platoon leader) in the 2./Aufklärungs-Abteilung 341 (motorized)	22 February 1942*	Killed in action 6 January 1942	—
Gottfried Kunze	Heer	Hauptmann of the Reserves	Leader of the I./Grenadier-Regiment 211	20 April 1945	—	—
Herbert Kunze	Luftwaffe	Oberfeldwebel	Observer in a Kampfgeschwader (Note: According to Scherzer as observer in the 8./Kampfgeschwader 26.)	31 October 1944	—	—
Karl Kunzmann	Heer	Oberfeldwebel	Zugführer (platoon leader) in the 8./Panzer-Regiment 35	21 September 1944*	Killed on active service 5 August 1944	—
Baptist Kupfer	Heer	Grenadier	Machine gunner in the 4.(MG)/Grenadier-Regiment 544 (Note: According to Scherzer as machine gunner in the 4./Grenadier-Regiment 544.)	25 July 1944	—	—
Dr. jur. Ernst Kupfer+	Luftwaffe	Hauptmann	Staffelkapitän of the 7./Sturzkampfgeschwader 2 "Immelmann"	23 November 1941	Awarded 173rd Oak Leaves 8 January 1943; 62nd Swords 11 April 1944	—
Hans Kupka	Heer	Leutnant	Company leader in Grenadier-Regiment 20 (motorized)	14 November 1943*	Died of wounds 15 October 1943	—
Georg Kupke (Note: According to Scherzer name is spelled Georg Kupka.)	Heer	Oberstleutnant	Commander of Grenadier-Regiment 1075	18 November 1944	—	—
[Dr.] Ernst Kuppinger+	Heer	Hauptmann	Leader of the II./Grenadier-Regiment 352	24 December 1944	Awarded 819th Oak Leaves 5 April 1945	—
Herbert Kuppisch	Kriegsmarine	Kapitänleutnant	Commander of U-94	14 May 1941	—	
Gottfried Kupsch	Heer	Oberleutnant of the Reserves	Leader of the 1./Radfahr-Abteilung 72	3 September 1942*	Killed in action 16 June 1942	—
Eberhard von Kurowski	Heer	Oberst im Generalstab (in the General Staff)	Chief of the Generalstab XXXX. Armeekorps	23 January 1942	—	—
Hans Kurscheid	Heer	Leutnant	Leader of the 1./Grenadier-Regiment 426	28 October 1944	—	—
Claus von Kursell	Heer	Hauptmann of the Reserves	Leader of the II./Grenadier-Regiment 3	17 October 1944	—	—
Hans Kurz	Heer	Hauptmann	Commander of the II./Grenadier-Regiment 994	9 December 1944	—	—
Karl Kurz	Heer	Oberleutnant	Chief of the 9./Gebirgs-Artillerie-Regiment 95	5 March 1945	—	—
Rudolf Kurz	Luftwaffe	Oberfähnrich	Leader of the 2./Fallschirmjäger-Regiment 12 (Note: According to Scherzer as leader of the 2./Fallschirmjäger-Sturm-Regiment (12).)	18 November 1944	—	A man wearing a military uniform with an Iron Cross displayed at his neck.
Wilhelm Kurz	Heer	Hauptmann of the Reserves	Commander of the II./Panzergrenadier-Regiment 125	20 October 1944	—	—
Max Kurze	Heer	Major of the Reserves	Commander of Panzer-Jäger-Abteilung 187	20 September 1944	—	—
Franz Kusatz	Luftwaffe	Major	Staffelkapitän of the Nachtaufklärungs Staffel (Note: According to Scherzer as Staffelkapitän of the Aufklärungsstaffel 1.(F)/Nacht.)	25 November 1942*	Killed in flying accident 25 October 1942	—
Ortwin Kuske	Waffen-SS	SS-Untersturmführer	Leader of the 3./SS-Panzer-Aufklärungs-Abteilung 17 "Götz von Berlichingen" (Note: According to Scherzer as leader of the 3./SS-Panzer-Aufklärungs-Abteilung 17.)	26 November 1944	—	—
Herbert Kutscha	Luftwaffe	Leutnant of the Reserves (Note: According to Scherzer as Leutnant (war officer) and pilot in the 6./Zerstörergeschwader 1.)	Pilot in the II./Schnellkampfgeschwader 210	24 September 1942	—	—
Alfred Kutscher	Heer	Leutnant	Leader of the 2./Divisions-Füsilier-Bataillon 35	18 January 1944	—	—
Ernst Kutschkau+	Heer	Oberfeldwebel of the Reserves (Note: According to Scherzer as Oberfeldwebel.)	Leader of the 6./Grenadier-Regiment 3	16 April 1944	Awarded 777th Oak Leaves 11 March 1945	—
Alfred Kuzmany	Heer	Oberstleutnant	Commander of Infanterie-Regiment 338	2 February 1942	—	—
Ekkehard Kylling-Schmidt+	Heer	Leutnant	Leader of the 3./Infanterie-Regiment 26	20 October 1941	Awarded 150th Oak Leaves 4 December 1942	—
Paul Kynast	Heer	Oberstleutnant	Commander of Grenadier-Regiment 587	4 June 1944*	Killed in action 16 April 1944	—
