= American Review of International Arbitration =

- Discipline: International arbitration, International law
- Language: English

Publication details
- History: 1994
- Publisher: Juris Publishing (United States)
- Frequency: Quarterly

Standard abbreviations
- Bluebook: Am. Rev. Int'l Arb.
- ISO 4: Am. Rev. Int. Arbitr.

Indexing
- ISSN: 1050-4109

Links
- Journal homepage

The American Review of International Arbitration is a quarterly academic journal covering international arbitration. It is run and edited by faculty members at Columbia University Law School, as well as practitioners in international arbitration.

The journal publishes articles on international arbitration. It also publishes case summaries and reviews of new books in the field.

As of 2012, the American Review of International Arbitration is the most cited international arbitration law journal in the world., and the fourth most cited for international trade. The journal has been described by its peers as "a journal which all involved in the international arbitration process ought to give serious attention to."

The journal is edited by Professor George Bermann, Professor Robert Smit and Professor Kabir Duggal at Columbia University Law School.
