= Sandra Bermann =

American literary scholar

- Occupation: Literary scholar
- Spouse: George Bermann

Academic background
- Education: Smith College; University of Pavia; Columbia University

Academic work
- Discipline: Comparative literature
- Institutions: Princeton University

Sandra Bermann is an American literary scholar. She is the Cotsen Professor of the Humanities and Professor of Comparative Literature at Princeton University. Her research and writing focuses on poetry, translation, and literary theory. She served as president of the American Comparative Literature Association from 2007 to 2009, and chaired Princeton's Comparative Literature department from 1998 to 2010. In 2011, she succeeded Harvey S. Rosen as the Head of Whitman College. Bermann was succeeded by Claire F. Gmachl on July 1, 2019.

== Biography ==
Bermann graduated from Smith College in 1969. She pursued further studies at the University of Pavia in 1970. From Columbia University she earned a master's degree in 1971 and a doctorate in 1976.

Bermann is married to George Bermann.

== Selected works ==
- Manzoni, Alessandro (1984). On the historical novel. Translated by Bermann, Sandra. Lincoln: University of Nebraska Press. ISBN 0-8032-3084-2. OCLC 9575018.
- Bermann, Sandra (1988). The Sonnet Over Time: A Study in the Sonnets of Petrarch, Shakespeare, and Baudelaire. University of North Carolina Press. ISBN 978-0-8078-7063-1.
- Bermann, Sandra; Wood, Michael, eds. (2005). Nation, Language, and the Ethics of Translation. Princeton, N.J.: Princeton University Press. ISBN 978-1-4008-2668-1. OCLC 592756171.
- Bermann, Sandra; Porter, Catherine, eds. (2014). A Companion to Translation Studies. John Wiley & Sons. ISBN 978-1-118-61615-4.
