= Theodore O. Yntema =

American economist (1900–1985)

- Born: 1900
- Died: 1985 (aged 84–85)
- Relatives: Dr. Hessel E. Yntema (brother)

Academic background
- Education: University of Illinois; Hope College; University of Chicago

Academic work
- Discipline: Quantitative analysis in finance.

Theodore Otte Yntema (1900 – September 18, 1985) was an American economist specializing in the field of quantitative analysis in finance.

== Education ==
Yntema graduated summa cum laude in 1921 from Hope College as valedictorian. in 1922, he received his master's degree from the University of Illinois. Yntema received his PhD from the University of Chicago in 1929.

== Career ==
Yntema became the director of research of the Cowles Commission at the time of its move to Chicago, in September 1939. He joined the faculty of the University of Chicago in 1923, and was professor of statistics in the School of Business, from 1930 to 1944, and professor of business and economic policy, from 1944 to 1949. Since 1940, Yntema served as director of the National Bureau of Economic Research. In 1940, he was elected as a Fellow of the American Statistical Association.

In 1949, he joined the Finance department at Ford Motor Company, supervising a group of junior executives which included Arjay Miller and Robert S. McNamara, both of whom went on to become presidents of Ford. He eventually became chairman of the board of Ford Motor Credit. Yntema was involved in the creation of the Committee for Economic Development and, from 1961 to 1966, served as chairman of its Research and Policy Committee.

Yntema wrote ''A Mathematical Reformulation of the Theory of International Trade'' in 1935. In 1946, he was co-author of ''Jobs and Markets.'' The University of Chicago Booth School of Business established the Theodore O. Yntema Professorship in 1973.
