= Claire F. Gmachl =

Austrian electrical engineer

- Born: 1967 (age 58–59); Salzburg, Austria
- Education: University of Innsbruck (M.Sc); Technical University of Vienna (Ph.D)
- Known for: Quantum Cascade Laser research and development
- Awards: IEE Snell Premium Award (August 2003); MacArthur Foundation genius grant (September 2005); MIT Technology Review TR100 (2002); Director of MIRTHE
- Scientific career
- Fields: Applied Physicist; Electrical Engineer
- Workplaces: Bell Laboratories (1996-2003); Princeton University (2003-present)

Claire F. Gmachl is the Eugene Higgins Professor of Electrical Engineering at Princeton University. She is best known for her work in the development of quantum cascade lasers.

== Education and honors ==
Gmachl earned her M.Sc. in physics from the University of Innsbruck in 1991. She went on to receive her Ph.D. in electrical engineering from the Technical University of Vienna in 1995, graduating sub auspiciis Praesidentis (with special honors by the president of the Austrian republic). Her studies focused on integrated optical modulators and tunable surface-emitting lasers in the near infrared. From 1996 to 1998, she was a postdoctoral member of technical staff at Bell Laboratories. In 1998, she became a formal member of technical staff at Bell Labs and in 2002 she was named a distinguished member of technical staff, in part due to her work on the development of the quantum cascade laser. In 2003, she left Bell Labs and took a position as associate professor in the department of electrical engineering at Princeton University, where she is currently working as a full professor since 2007.

In 2004, Popular Science named Gmachl in its "Class of 2004 - Brilliant 10," its list of the 10 most promising scientists under 40. She went on, in September 2005, to win the MacArthur Foundation's "genius grant." Recently, she was named the director of the new Mid-InfraRed Technologies for Health and the Environment (MIRTHE) Center, funded by the National Science Foundation.

Gmachl succeeded Sandra Bermann as head of Whitman College, Princeton University on July 1, 2019.

== Research ==
Although Gmachl originally intended to study theoretical applied mathematics, her interest soon turned to theoretical applied physics, and, with the encouragement of an advisor, experimental sciences. As such, she works in the fields of optics and semiconductor laser technology. Gmachl has conceived several novel designs for solid-state lasers and her work has led to advances in the development of quantum cascade lasers.

QC lasers are a rapidly evolving class of high-performance, mid-infrared, semiconductor light sources. They offer considerable wavelength tunability, high output power, high-speed modulation capabilities and may be fabricated in several different materials systems. Gmachl has demonstrated mid-infrared light sources for a wide range of applications, including trace gas sensing in the environmental, industrial, and medical fields, and free-space optics in wireless communications. Her recent work includes the development of QC microlasers and new hybrid devices including quantum cascade structures and nonlinear components, dramatically extending the wavelength range of QC technology. These designs have applications in environmental monitoring, clinical diagnoses, spectroscopy, and chemical process control.

== Awards ==
- "The Snell Premium" award of the IEE, UK, August 2003
- Bell Labs "Distinguished Member of Staff", December 2002
- MIT Technology Review TR100, 2002, as one of the top 100 innovators in the world under the age of 35
- IEEE/LEOS Distinguished Lecturer '02 - '03, April 2002
- Commendation for Excellence in Technical Communications", Laser Focus World Magazine, 9/2001
- Outstanding Performer Award under the DARPA/MTO PWASSP Program, US DoD, July 2001
- NASA Group Achievement Award, co-recipient, NASA, Washington D.C., 2000
  - "For making the first atmospheric measurements using a quantum-cascade laser, thereby demonstrating its applicability to in situ terrestrial and planetary instrumentation." - Bell Labs
- Solid State Physics Award of the Austrian Physical Society, Austria, 1996
- 1995 Christian Doppler Award for engineering sciences including environmental sciences, Austria, 1996
- Graduation "sub auspicies praesidentis" by the president of Austria, Vienna, Austria, 1996

== Selected publications ==
- Claire Gmachl, Alexey Belyanin, Deborah L. Sivco, Milton L. Peabody, Nina Owschimikow, A. Michael Sergent, Federico Capasso, and Alfred Y. Cho. Optimized Second-Harmonic Generation in Quantum Cascade Lasers. IEEE J. Quantum Electron. 39 (11), in print (2003)
- Nina Owschimikow, Claire Gmachl, Alexey Belyanin, Vitaly Kocharovsky, Deborah L. Sivco, Raffaele Colombelli, Federico Capasso, and Alfred Y. Cho. Resonant Second-Order Nonlinear Optical Processes in Quantum Cascade Lasers. Phys. Rev. Lett. 90(4), 043902-1-4 (2003)
- C. Gmachl, A. Soibel, R. Colombelli, D. L. Sivco, F. Capasso, and A. Y. Cho. Minimal Group Refractive Index Dispersion and Gain Evolution in Ultra-Broadband Quantum Cascade Lasers. IEEE Photon. Techn. Lett. 14 (12), pp. 1671 – 1672 (2002)
- Claire Gmachl, Axel Straub, Raffaele Colombelli, Federico Capasso, Deborah L. Sivco, A. Michael Sergent, and Alfred Y. Cho. Single-mode, Tunable Distributed-Feedback and Multiple-Wavelength Quantum Cascade Lasers. IEEE J. Quantum Electron. 38, 569 - 581 (2002) invited paper
- Claire Gmachl, Evgueni E. Narimanov, Federico Capasso, James N. Baillargeon, Alfred Y. Cho. Kolmogorov Arnold Moser transition and laser action on scar modes in semiconductor diode lasers with deformed resonators. Opt. Lett. 27, pp. 824 – 826 (2002)
- C. Gmachl, D. L. Sivco, R. Colombelli, F. Capasso, and A. Y. Cho. Ultra-broadband semiconductor laser. Nature 415, pp. 883 – 887 (2002)
- Claire Gmachl, Federico Capasso, Deborah L. Sivco, and Alfred Y. Cho. Recent progress in quantum cascade lasers and applications. Reports on Progress in Physics 64, pp. 1533 – 1601 (2001)
