= Comparative law =

Study of relationship between legal systems

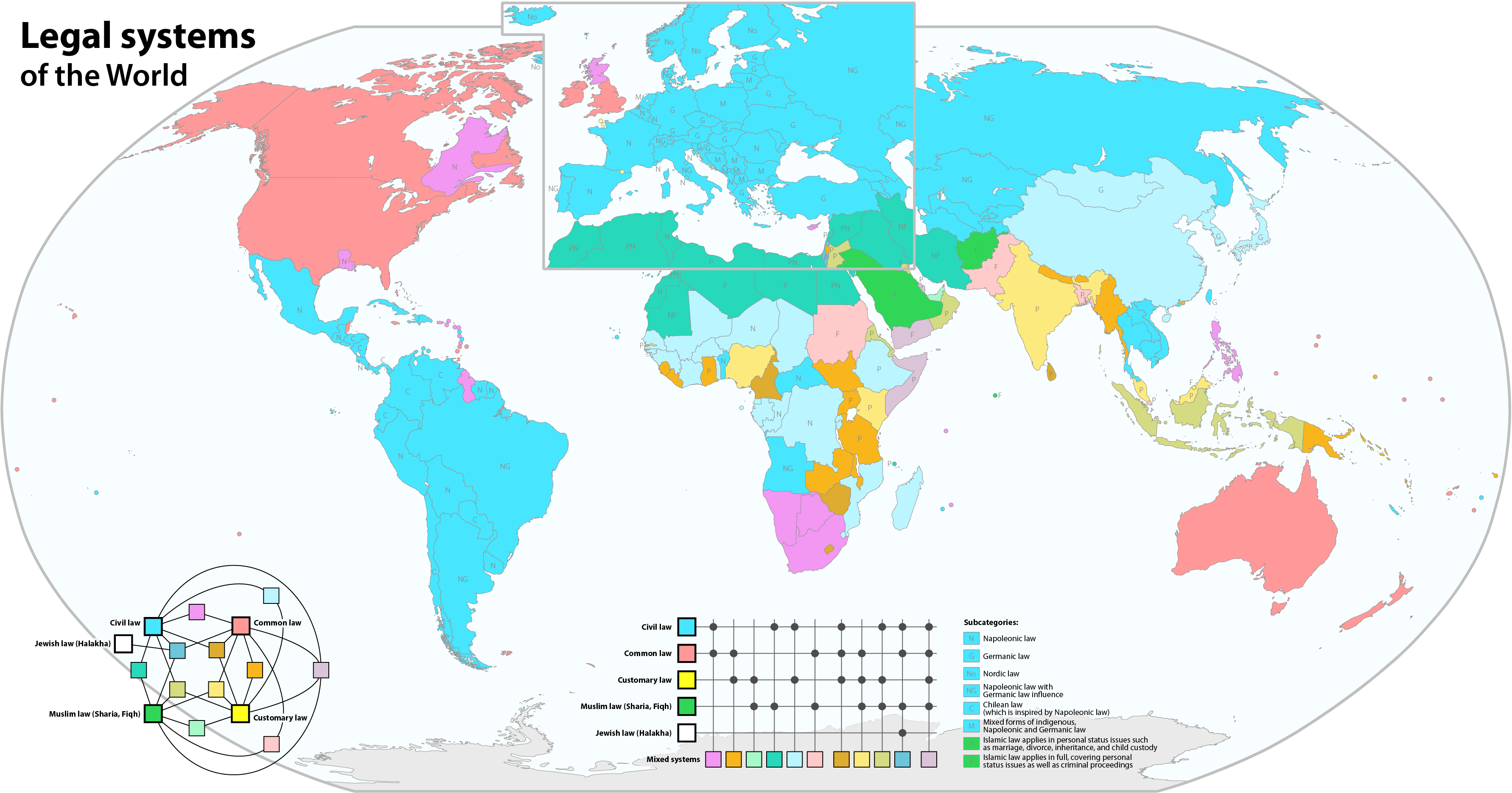
Legal Systems of the World

Comparative law is the study of differences and similarities between the law and legal systems of different countries. More specifically, it involves the study of the different legal systems (or "families") in existence around the world, including common law, civil law, socialist law, canon law, Jewish law, Islamic law, Hindu law, and Chinese law. It includes the description and analysis of foreign legal systems, even where no explicit comparison is undertaken. The importance of comparative law has increased enormously in the present age of internationalism and economic globalization.

== History ==
The origins of modern comparative law can be traced back to Gottfried Wilhelm Leibniz in 1667 in his Latin-language book Nova Methodus Discendae Docendaeque Iurisprudentiae (New Methods of Studying and Teaching Jurisprudence). Chapter 7 (Presentation of Law as the Project for all Nations, Lands and Times) introduces the idea of classifying Legal Systems into several families. A few years later, Leibniz introduced an idea of Language families.

Although every legal system is unique, comparative law through studies of their similarities and differences allows for classification of legal systems, wherein law families is the basic level of the classification. The main differences between law families are found in the source(s) of law, the role of court precedents, the origin and development of the legal system. Montesquieu is generally regarded as an early founding figure of comparative law. His comparative approach is obvious in the following excerpt from Chapter III of Book I of his masterpiece, De l'esprit des lois (1748; first translated by Thomas Nugent, 1750):

[T]he political and civil laws of each nation ... should be adapted in such a manner to the people for whom they are framed that it should be a great chance if those of one nation suit another.

They should be in relation to the nature and principle of each government: whether they form it, as may be said of politic laws; or whether they support it, as in the case of civil institutions.

They should be in relation to the climate of each country, to the quality of its soil, to its situation and extent, to the principal occupation of the natives, whether husbandmen, huntsmen, or shepherds: they should have relation to the degree of liberty which the constitution will bear; to the religion of the inhabitants, to their inclinations, riches, numbers, commerce, manners, and customs.

Also, in Chapter XI (entitled 'How to compare two different Systems of Laws') of Book XXIX, discussing the French and English systems for punishment of false witnesses, he advises that "to determine which of those systems is most agreeable to reason, we must take them each as a whole and compare them in their entirety." Yet another place where Montesquieu's comparative approach is evident is the following, from Chapter XIII of Book XXIX:

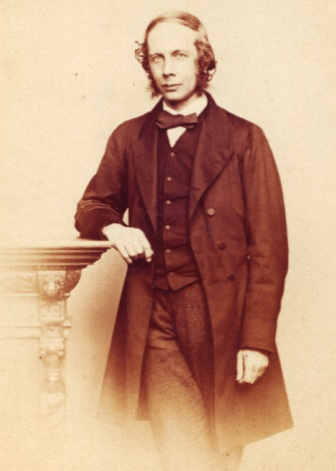
Sir Henry James Sumner Maine, British jurist and first professor of comparative law at Oxford

As the civil laws depend on the political institutions, because they are made for the same society, whenever there is a design of adopting the civil law of another nation, it would be proper to examine beforehand whether they have both the same institutions and the same political law.

The modern founding figure of comparative and anthropological jurisprudence was Sir Henry Maine, a British jurist and legal historian. In his 1861 work Ancient Law: Its Connection with the Early History of Society, and Its Relation to Modern Ideas, he set out his views on the development of legal institutions in primitive societies and engaged in a comparative discussion of Eastern and Western legal traditions. This work placed comparative law in its historical context and was widely read and influential.

The first university course on the subject was established at the University of Oxford in 1869, with Maine taking up the position of professor.

Comparative law in the US was brought by a legal scholar fleeing persecution in Germany, Rudolf Schlesinger. Schlesinger eventually became professor of comparative law at Cornell Law School helping to spread the discipline throughout the US.

== Purpose ==
Comparative law is an academic discipline that involves the study of legal systems, including their constitutive elements and how they differ, and how their elements combine into a system.

Several disciplines have developed as separate branches of comparative law, including comparative constitutional law, comparative administrative law, comparative civil law (in the sense of the law of torts, contracts, property and obligations), comparative commercial law (in the sense of business organisations and trade), and comparative criminal law. Studies of these specific areas may be viewed as micro- or macro-comparative legal analysis, i.e. detailed comparisons of two countries, or broad-ranging studies of several countries. Comparative civil law studies, for instance, show how the law of private relations is organised, interpreted and used in different systems or countries. The purposes of comparative law are:

- To attain a deeper knowledge of the legal systems in effect
- To perfect the legal systems in effect
- Possibly, to contribute to a unification of legal systems, of a smaller or larger scale (cf. for instance, the UNIDROIT initiative)

== Relationship with other legal subjects ==
Comparative law is different from general jurisprudence (i.e. legal theory) and from public and private international law. However, it helps inform all of these areas of normativity.

For example, comparative law can help international legal institutions, such as those of the United Nations System, in analyzing the laws of different countries regarding their treaty obligations. Comparative law would be applicable to private international law when developing an approach to interpretation in a conflicts analysis. Comparative law may contribute to legal theory by creating categories and concepts of general application. Comparative law may also provide insights into the question of legal transplants, i.e. the transplanting of law and legal institutions from one system to another. The notion of legal transplants was coined by Alan Watson, one of the world's renowned legal scholars specializing in comparative law. Gunther Teubner expanded the notion of legal transplantation to include legal irritation: Rather than smoothly integrating into domestic legal systems, a foreign rule disrupts established norms and societal arrangements. This disruption sparks an evolution where the external rule's meaning is redefined and where significant transformations within the internal context are triggered. Lasse Schuldt added that irritation is not spontaneous, but requires institutional drivers.

Also, the usefulness of comparative law for sociology of law and law and economics (and vice versa) is very large. The comparative study of the various legal systems may show how different legal regulations for the same problem function in practice. Conversely, sociology of law and law & economics may help comparative law answer questions, such as:

- How do regulations in different legal systems really function in the respective societies?
- Are legal rules comparable?
- How do the similarities and differences between legal systems get explained?

== Classifications of legal systems ==
=== David ===
René David proposed the classification of legal systems, according to the different ideology inspiring each one, into five groups or families:

- Western laws, a group subdivided into the:
  - Civil law subgroup (whose jurisprudence is based on post-classical Roman Law)
  - Common law subgroup (originating in English law)
- Soviet Law
- Muslim Law
- Hindu Law
- Chinese Law
- Jewish Law

Especially with respect to the aggregating by David of the Civil and Common laws into a single family, David argued that the antithesis between the Common law and Civil law systems, is of a technical rather than of an ideological nature. Of a different kind is, for instance, the antithesis between, say, Italian and American laws, and of a different kind than between the Soviet, Muslim, Hindu, or Chinese laws. According to David, the Civil law legal systems included those countries where legal science was formulated according to Roman law, whereas Common law countries are those dominated by judge-made law. The characteristics that he believed uniquely differentiate the Western legal family from the other four are:

- liberal democracy
- capitalist economy
- Christian religion

=== Arminjon, Nolde, and Wolff ===
Arminjon, Nolde, and Wolff believed that, for purposes of classifying the (then) contemporary legal systems of the world, it was required that those systems per se get studied, irrespective of external factors, such as geographical ones. They proposed the classification of legal system into seven groups, or so-called 'families', in particular the:

- French group, under which they also included the countries that codified their law either in 19th or in the first half of the 20th century, using the Napoleonic code civil of year 1804 as a model; this includes countries and jurisdictions such as Italy, Portugal, Spain, Romania, Louisiana, various South American states such as Brazil, Quebec, Saint Lucia, the Ionian Islands, Egypt, and Lebanon
- German group
- Scandinavian group, comprising the laws of Denmark, Norway, Sweden, Finland, and Iceland
- English group, including, inter alia, England, the United States, Canada, Australia, and New Zealand
- Russian group
- Islamic group (used in the Muslim world)
- Hindu group

=== Zweigert and Kötz ===
Konrad Zweigert and Hein Kötz propose a different, multidimensional methodology for categorizing laws, i.e. for ordering families of laws. They maintain that, to determine such families, five criteria should be taken into account, in particular: the historical background, the characteristic way of thought, the different institutions, the recognized sources of law, and the dominant ideology. Using the aforementioned criteria, they classify the legal systems of the world into six families:

- Roman family
- German family
- Common law family
- Nordic family
- Family of the laws of the Far East (China and Japan)
- Religious family (Jewish, Muslim, and Hindu law)

Up to the second German edition of their introduction to comparative law, Zweigert and Kötz also used to mention Soviet or socialist law as another family of laws.

=== Glenn ===
H. Patrick Glenn proposed the classification of legal systems places national laws in the broader context of major legal tradition:

- Chthonic (or indigenous) law
- Talmudic law
- Islamic law
- Hindu law
- Confucian law
- Civil law
- Common law

== Professional associations ==
- American Association of Law Libraries
- American Society of Comparative Law
- International Association of Judicial Independence and World Peace
- International Association of Procedural Law
- International Law Association

== Comparative law periodicals ==
- American Journal of Comparative Law
- German Law Journal
- Journal of Comparative Legislation and International Law
- The Journal of Comparative Law

== See also ==
- Annual Bulletin of the Comparative Law Bureau (American Bar Association: 1908–1914, 1933), the first comparative law journal in the U.S.
- Comparative criminal justice
- Comparative law wiki, online wikis where jurists can complete questionnaires regarding their home legal system
- Friedrich Carl von Savigny (1779–1861) – a German legal scholar who wrote on comparative law
- List of national legal systems
- Rule according to higher law
- Rule of law
