= Kötz (Günz) =

River in Germany

Location
- Country: Germany
- State: Bavaria

Physical characteristics
- Mouth
  - location: Günz
  - coordinates: 48.4101°N 10.2847°E
- Length: 19.5 km (12.1 mi)

Basin features
- Progression: Günz→ Danube→ Black Sea

Kötz is a river of Bavaria, Germany. It is a left tributary of the Günz near the village Kötz.

== See also ==
- List of rivers of Bavaria
