= Comparative criminal justice =

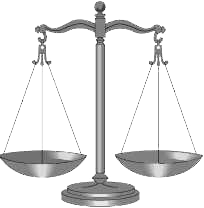
The Scale of Justice

Comparative criminal justice is a subfield of the study of Criminal justice that compares justice systems worldwide. Such study can take a descriptive, historical, or political approach. It studies the similarities and differences in structure, goals, punishment and emphasis on rights as well as the history and political stature of different systems. It is common to broadly categorize the functions of a criminal justice system into policing, adjudication (i.e.: courts), and corrections, although other categorization schemes exist. Comparativists study the four different types of societies, their methods of enforcement and their different types of punishment such as capital punishment, and imprisonment. Within these societies they study different types of legal tradition and analyze the issues they solve and create. They use their information in order to learn effective ways of enforcing laws, and to identify and solve problems that may arise within a system due to its methods.

== Societies ==
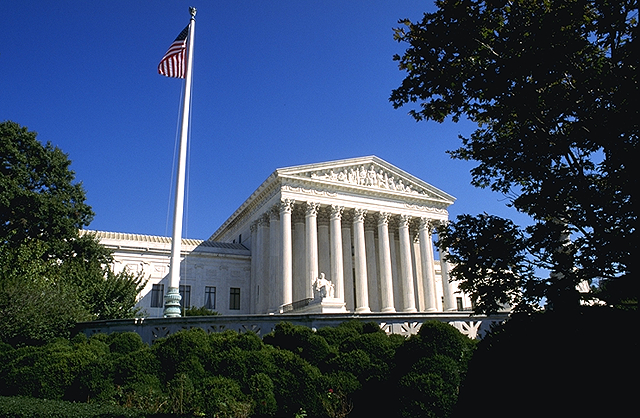
U.S. Supreme Court

Comparativists in criminal justice study four different kinds of societies: Folk-communal, Urban-commercial, Urban-industrial, and bureaucratic. Folk-communal societies are often seen as primitive and barbaric, they have little specialization among law enforcers, and let many problems go unpunished to avoid over-criminalization however, once tempers “boil over” and the situation becomes a larger issue, harsh and unusual punishment may be administered. Examples are African or Middle Eastern Tribes, or early puritan settlements of America. Urban-commercial societies have few written laws and some specialized enforcement for religious or king’s law enforcement. Punishments are inconsistent and usually harsh. Urban-industrial societies enforce laws that prescribe good behavior and give incentives and disincentives for behavior and police are specialized in property crimes such as theft. Finally, bureaucratic societies are today’s modern society. They feature fully developed laws, lawyers, and police forces trained for multiple types of crime. Different “side effects” of these societies include over-criminalization, overcrowding, and even juvenile delinquency due to the extended age of adolescence these societies bring on.

== Legal Traditions ==
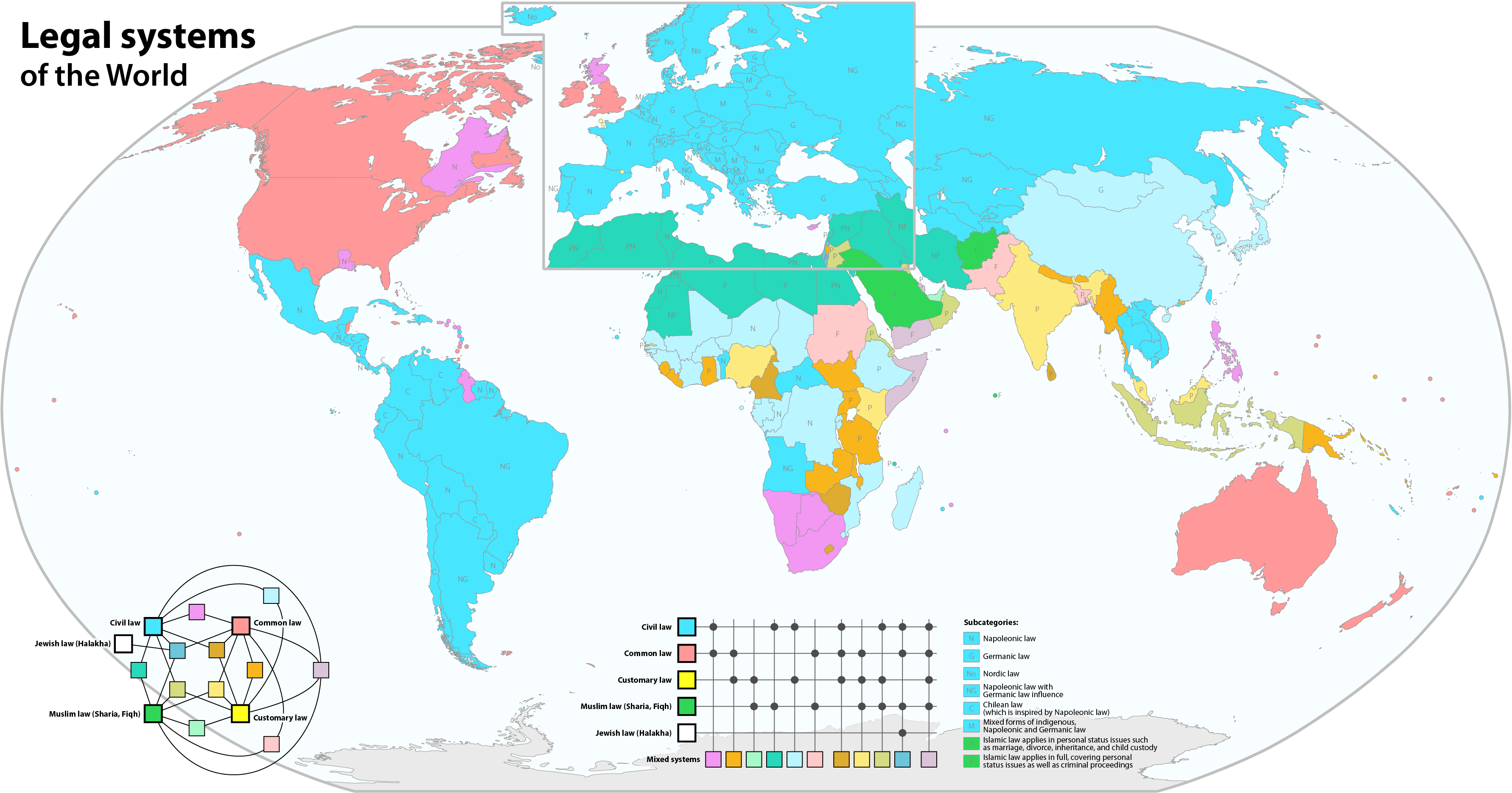
A Map of the Legal systems of the World.

Legal traditions play an important role in the development of international law and justice. Comparativists for criminal justice study these traditions with the intent of finding a way to combine the views of different traditions towards a single view that allows for the successful development of international law. Many comparativists believe that the more states with similar legal views the more likely it is to be able to create international laws that please all. Reichel (2005) identifies four major legal traditions that each have their own respective body of laws:

- Common law is found particularly in countries that are current or former members of the British Empire.
- Civil law countries include most of continental Europe and various states in South America and Africa.
- Socialist law is essentially civil law with major modifications from Marxist-Leninist ideology. It is currently only used in China and a few other contemporary Communist states, but has had enormous influence on Russia and the former USSR.
- Islamic law is religiously-inspired law used in Muslim countries.

== Punishment ==
Map of death penalty

People who study comparative criminal justice study different forms and use of punishment across societies, including capital punishment. Fifty-nine countries retain the death penalty as reported in 2007. Comparativists study the different ways in which execution is carried out across the world including hanging, shooting, beheading, injection, electrocution, and even stoning. Comparativists find that in many developing countries such as Iran, Indonesia, Belarus, and many others, that violent methods of execution such as hanging beheading, shooting, and stoning are much more common ways of carrying out the death penalty, and in many cases the only ways. However in western culture as well as developed countries such as the United States less brutal execution such as lethal injection is utilized. Even prison sentences can come harshly. In many countries such as Burma a person can be sentenced to prison for merely disagreeing with the government. Presumably ridiculous sentences such as multiple life sentences or sentences of hundreds, even thousands of years are meant to prohibit the chance of parole in the future. Although it may seem preposterous, western cultures carry out the same type of sentencing. Even though similar sentences are used across the globe leniency is varied widely between societies. Many governments such as the one mentioned above in Burma provide swift and heavy punishment to assert their roles of power.

== See also ==
- Comparative law
- Law
- Criminal law
- Criminal justice
- Rule of Law Index
