= Hessel E. Yntema =

Hessel E. Yntema (1891-1966) was a law professor and scholar. Yntema studied at Hope College, the University of Michigan, Oxford University, and Harvard Law School. Yntema taught at Columbia Law School, Johns Hopkins, the University of Michigan. Yntema was a leading legal realist. Yntema founded The American Journal of Comparative Law in 1952 and ran the journal until his death. His final position was professor emeritus at the University of Michigan. In 1961, the book Twentieth Century Comparative and Conflicts Law: Legal Essays in Honor of Hessel E. Yntema was published, consisting of 38 essays from his peers. In addition to his professorship, Yntema served as the vice-president of the International Academy of Comparative Law.
