= Richard Kotz =

German General and Knight's Cross recipients

- Born: 12 September 1886; Waldau, Upper Lusatia, German Empire
- Died: 8 June 1960 (aged 73); Bad Honnef, North Rhine-Westphalia, West Germany
- Military career
- Allegiance: German Empire (to 1918); Weimar Republic (to 1927); Nazi Germany
- Branch: Army
- Service years: 1905–1927; 1934–1945
- Rank: Generalmajor
- Commands: Grenadier-Regiment 389
- Conflicts: World War I World War II: Invasion of Poland; Battle of France; Operation Barbarossa; Siege of Leningrad; Italian Campaign
- Awards: Knight's Cross of the Iron Cross
- Other work: Military Advisor to Turkey; Military Advisor to China

Richard Kotz (12 September 1886 – 8 June 1960) was a highly decorated Generalmajor in the Wehrmacht during World War II. He was also a recipient of the Knight's Cross of the Iron Cross. The Knight's Cross of the Iron Cross, and its variants were the highest awards in the military and paramilitary forces of Nazi Germany during World War II. Kotz was captured by American troops in May 1945 and was held until January 1947.

== Awards and decorations ==
- Iron Cross (1914)
  - 2nd Class
  - 1st Class
- Prussian Golden Military Merit Cross on 3 May 1918 as deputy officer in the 4. Garde-Regiment zu Fuß
- Honour Cross of the World War 1914/1918
- Iron Cross (1939)
  - 2nd Class
  - 1st Class
- Eastern Front Medal
- German Cross in Gold (13 January 1943)
- Knight's Cross of the Iron Cross on 21 October 1943 as Oberst and commander of Grenadier-Regiment 389
