= American Society of Comparative Law =

- Logo of the American Society of Comparative Law
- Formation: 1951
- Type: Legal Society
- Headquarters: rotating
- Location: United States
- Website: ascl.org

The American Society of Comparative Law (ASCL), formerly the American Association for the Comparative Study of Law, is a learned society dedicated to the study of comparative law, foreign law, and private international law. It was founded in 1951, and was admitted to American Council of Learned Societies in 1995. The ASCL is incorporated as a 501(c)(3) non-profit organization under the U.S. Internal Revenue Code.

The ASCL publishes the American Journal of Comparative Law on a quarterly basis. It was established at the University of Michigan Law School in 1952, where ASCL Vice President and first Editor-in-Chief Hessel E. Yntema was a professor. Yntema served as Editor-in-Chief until his death in 1966. The journal moved from Michigan to the University of California, Berkeley, in 1971, but returned in 2003.

== See also ==
- American Society of International Law
