= Hein Kötz =

German jurist

Hein Kötz (born 14 November 1935) is a German jurist, former Director of the Max-Planck-Institute for foreign and international private law (MPI-PRIV), the Bucerius Law School and Vice President of the Deutsche Forschungsgemeinschaft (DFG).

== Biography ==
Kötz was born in Schneidemühl (Posen-West Prussia) (today Piła, Poland) and received his doctorate at the University of Hamburg in 1962. In 1963 he received his Master of Comparative Law at the University of Michigan and habilitated 1970 in Hamburg. Kötz worked as a Professor at the University of Konstanz in 1971–78 and as a judge at the Oberlandesgericht Karlsruhe in 1975–78.

In 1978 he moved to Hamburg, where he became the Director of the Max-Planck-Institute for foreign and international private law (Max-Planck-Institut für ausländisches und internationales Privatrecht), a position he held until the year 2000. He became a Professor at the University of Hamburg (1981–1998) and was a member of the advisory board of the Gesellschaft für Rechtsvergleichung (1973–2001) and member of the Wissenschaftsrat (1986–1984).

Kötz was the Vice President of the Deutsche Forschungsgemeinschaft in 1986–89, head of the humane discipline section of the Max-Planck-Gesellschaft (MPG) in 1988–1991 and member of the law of obligations commission at the German Federal Department of Justice in 1986–1991.

Since 2000 Kötz is the President of the International Association of Legal Sciences and has been the first Director of the Bucerius Law School Hamburg.

== Awards ==
- On June 2, 1995 Kötz received an honorary doctorate from the Faculty of Law at Uppsala University, Sweden
- 2006: Bundesverdienstkreuz

== English language publications ==
- Rights of Third Parties. Third Party Beneficiaries and Assignment in: International Encyclopedia of Comparative Law (Vol. III, Chapter 13). J.C.B. Mohr (Paul Siebeck)/Martinus Nijhoff 1992.
- (with Norbert Horn und Hans G. Leser): German Private and Commercial Law: An Introduction. Oxford: Clarendon Press 1982. XVI.
