= American Journal of Comparative Law =

- Discipline: Comparative law, transnational law
- Language: English

Publication details
- Publisher: Oxford University Press
- Frequency: quarterly

Standard abbreviations
- Bluebook: Am. J. Comp. L.
- ISO 4: Am. J. Comp. Law

Indexing
- ISSN: 0002-919X

Links
- Journal homepage

The American Journal of Comparative Law (AJCL) (ISSN 0002-919X) is a quarterly, peer-reviewed, law journal devoted to comparative and transnational legal studies—addressing subjects such as comparative law, comparative and transnational legal history and theory, private international law and conflict of laws, and the study of legal systems, cultures, and traditions other than those of the United States.

The AJCL published articles authored by scholars representing all continents, regions, and legal cultures of the world. It is published by Oxford University Press on behalf of the American Society of Comparative Law. As of 2014, it was co-hosted and administered by the Institute of Comparative Law (McGill University) and the Georgetown University Law Center. Past hosts include institutions such as University of California Berkeley School of Law, Columbia Law School, and the University of Michigan Law School.

== Executive Editorial Board ==
In 2014, Helge Dedek (McGill University) and Franz Werro (Georgetown University) became the co-editors-in-chief. Former editors-in-chief include Hessel E. Yntema (1952–1966), B.J. George (1966–1968), Alfred F. Conard (1968–1970), John G. Fleming (1971–1987), Richard M. Buxbaum (1987–2003), George Bermann (2003–2006), James Gordley (2003–2008), Mathias W. Reimann (2003–2013), and James V. Feinerman (2014–2015).

The Executive Editorial Board of the AJCL is made up of the following people:

== Ranking and impact factor ==
The 2019 Israeli Inter-University Committee Report, which "offers a global ranking of academic legal publications, covering more than 900 outlets, and using a four-tier categorization...based on a combined quantitative and qualitative methodology," placed AJCL in its highest tier (A*). Of 908 journals evaluated, 38 others received an A* designation. "Peer-reviewed journals were ranked primarily on the basis of well-known databases that are used to assess peer-reviewed journals in many other disciplines. The Committee relied on up-to-date data from the following databases: SCImago Journal Rankings (SJR), CiteScore, and Web of Science (JCR). For example, because the two highest categories (A* and A) comprise one fifth of ranked journals, one of the main criteria for including a peer-reviewed journal in these categories was it being classified as a first-quartile (Q1) journal in the leading databases (e.g., SJR or CiteScore). The strongest among Q1 journals were included in A*, and the weakest (roughly 5%) were considered for B."

According to Thomas Reuters Journal Citation Reports, AJCL's impact factor (IF) was 1.327 in 2016, and it ranked 42nd of 147 journals in the Law category. The AJCL saw a drop in its impact factor in 2017, falling to 110 of 147 journals, with an IF of 0.58. According to the Washington and Lee University School of Law rankings, the Journal ranked first in the comparative law category (out of thirty-six journals), with a combined score of 100 and an impact factor of 0.85.

== See also ==
- Annual Bulletin of the Comparative Law Bureau (American Bar Association: 1908–1914, 1933), the first comparative law journal in the U.S.
