= Law of Uruguay =

The legal system of Uruguay belongs to the Continental Law tradition.

The basis for its public law is the 1967 Constitution, amended in 1989, 1994, 1996, and 2004. According to it, Uruguay is a democratic republic. There is a clear separation of functions, between the Executive Branch, the Legislative Branch and the Judicial Branch.

On the other hand, private relationships are governed by the Uruguayan Civil Code, which was first published in 1868, thanks to the work of Tristán Narvaja.

== Constitution ==
The Constitution of Uruguay (Constitución de la República Oriental del Uruguay) is the supreme law of Uruguay. Its first version was written in 1830 and its last amendment was made in 2004.

Uruguay's first constitution was adopted in 1830, following the conclusion of the three-year-long Cisplatine War in which Argentina and Uruguay acted as a federation: the United Provinces of the Río de la Plata. Mediated by the United Kingdom, the 1828 Treaty of Montevideo allowed to build the foundations for a Uruguayan state and constitution. It has been reformed in 1918, 1934, 1942, 1952 and 1967, but it still maintains several articles from its first version of 1830.

== Civil law ==
The Civil Code of the Oriental Republic of Uruguay (Spanish: Código Civil de la República Oriental del Uruguay) is a systematic collection of Uruguayan laws designed to comprehensively deal with the core areas of private law such as for dealing with business and negligence lawsuits and practices.

This civil code was originally published on 1 January 1868, it was the work of Tristan Narvaja, inspired in a project by Eduardo Acevedo. Important sources were the Roman law, Spanish legislation and canon law, as well as the Chilean Civil Code, the Spanish Civil Code, texts by Augusto Teixeira de Freitas and Dalmacio Vélez Sarsfield, the Code Napoléon and many others. In 1995 it was updated.

== Private international law ==
In matter of private international law or conflict of laws, the legal system of Uruguay is comprised by international treaties ratified by the country and domestic laws. Uruguay signed and ratified a number of treaties on conflict of laws from several international forums: such treaties from the Hague Conference on Private International Law at an international level, from the Inter-American Specialized Conferences on Private International Law of the Organization of American States at a continental level and from the MERCOSUR at a regional level.

Regarding the domestic law, the core law on conflicts of law is the new General Law on Private International Law number 19920, that replaced the old system of the Appendix to the Final Title of the Uruguayan Civil Code, established by Law number 10084 of 1941, updating and expanding the coverage of the domestic system of private international law that works in the situation of a lack of an international treaty on the matter in the specific case.

== See also ==
- Legal systems of the world
- Politics of Uruguay
- History of Uruguay
- Supreme Court of Uruguay
