= Uruguayan Civil Code =

Codification of the civil law in Uruguay

The Civil Code of the Oriental Republic of Uruguay (Spanish: Código Civil de la República Oriental del Uruguay) is a systematic collection of Uruguayan laws designed to comprehensively deal with the core areas of private law such as for dealing with business and negligence lawsuits and practices.

This civil code was originally published on 1 January 1868, it was the work of Tristan Narvaja, inspired in a project by Eduardo Acevedo. Important sources were the Roman law, Spanish legislation and canon law, as well as the Chilean Civil Code, the Spanish Civil Code, texts by Augusto Teixeira de Freitas and Dalmacio Vélez Sarsfield, the Code Napoléon and many others. In 1995 it was updated.

== See also ==
- Uruguayan law
- Civil code
- Constitution of Uruguay
