= Civil and Commercial code of Argentina =

Legal code in force in 2016

National Congress of Argentina
- Passed by: Chamber of Deputies
- Passed: 7 October 2014
- Passed by: Senate
- Passed: 8 October 2014
- Signed by: Argentine National Congress
- Signed: 1 October 2014
- Effective: 1 January 2016

Amended by
- DNU 70/2023
- Status: Amended

The Civil and Commercial Code of the Nation (abbreviated as CCyC, CCC, or CCCN) is the legal body that brings together the foundations of the legal framework in civil and commercial matters in Argentina. It was drafted by a commission of jurists appointed by Decree 191/2011 and was enacted in October 2014, coming into effect on August 1, 2015. It replaced the Civil Code of 1869, written by Dalmacio Vélez Sarsfield, and the Commercial Code of 1862, drafted by Eduardo Acevedo and Vélez Sarsfield.

The code contains 2,671 articles, replacing more than 4,500 articles enacted in 1869, and is to private life what the National Constitution is to public life, according to the words of its ideologue, Supreme Court Justice Ricardo Lorenzetti.

== History ==
=== Background ===
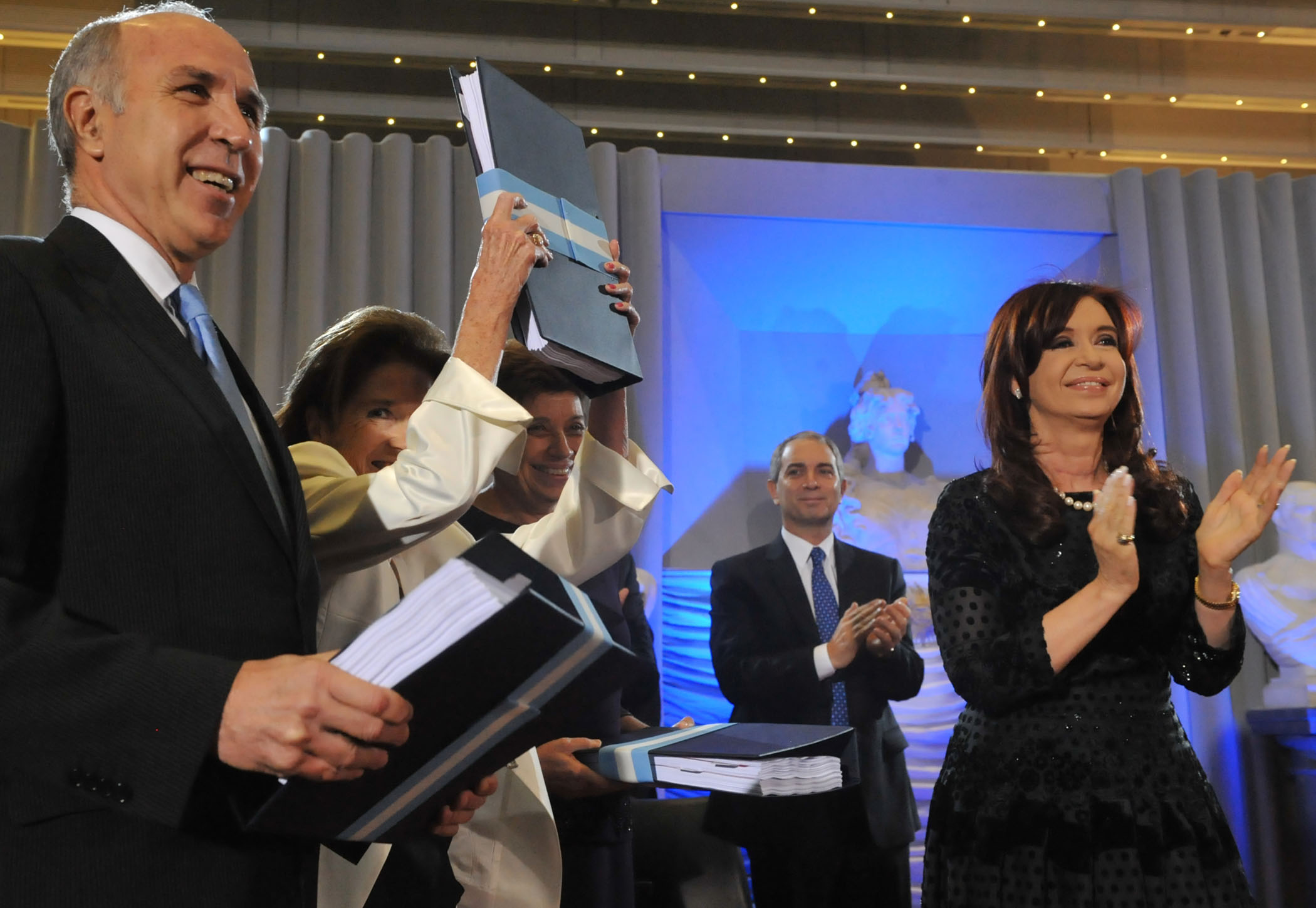
Presentation of the draft reform of the Civil and Commercial Code of the Nation in 2012.

In early 2011, through Presidential Decree 191/2011, the "Commission for the drafting of the bill to reform, update, and unify the Civil and Commercial Codes of the Nation" was established. It was composed of the President of the Supreme Court of Argentina, Ricardo Lorenzetti, the Vice President of the same body, Elena Highton de Nolasco, and former Justice of the Supreme Court of the Province of Mendoza, Aída Kemelmajer de Carlucci. The commission received proposals and contributions from numerous legal scholars.

=== Congressional treatment ===
The final text was approved by the Congress of the Nation on 1 October 2014, through Law No. 26,994, promulgated on 7 October 2014, and published in the Official Gazette on October 8 of the same year.

=== Entry into force ===
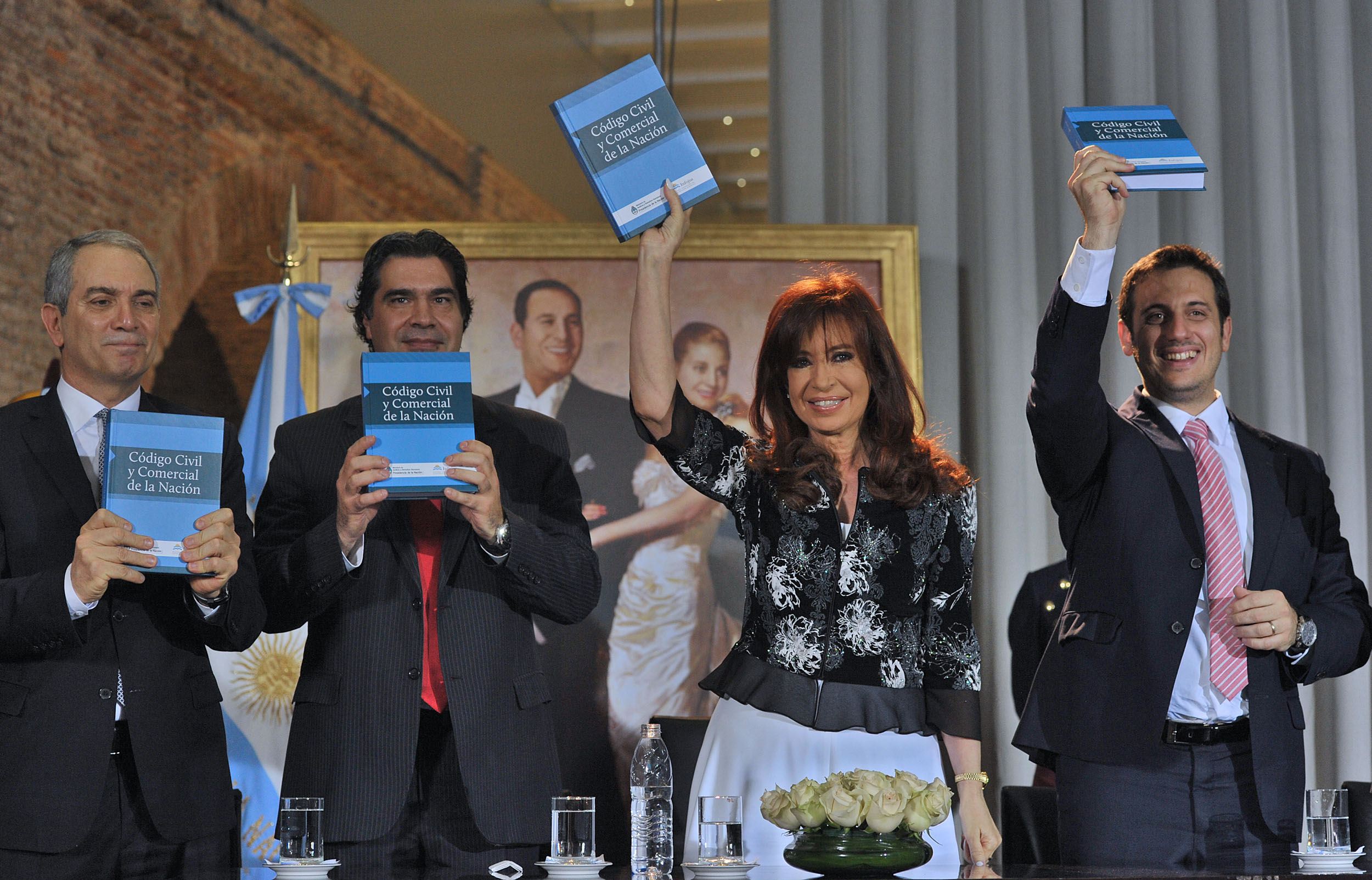
Presentation of the Civil and Commercial Code in October 2014.

In early October 2014, the new Argentine Civil and Commercial Code was promulgated. It was initially set to come into force on 1 January 2016, but this was brought forward to August 1, 2015, by Law No. 27,077 (published in the Official Gazette on 19.12.2014).

Upon its entry into force, a major debate arose in Argentina regarding the application of the Civil and Commercial Code of the Nation to ongoing legal situations and cases already in process. In 2015, the Civil and Commercial Court of Appeals of Trelew issued a plenary agreement aimed at unifying criteria within its jurisdiction regarding the enactment of the new legal framework.

This plenary agreement was widely circulated in the country due to the controversy it sparked. It ignited a dispute between those who agreed with the Court (such as Dr. Julio César Rivera) and those who favored the immediate application of the Code (such as Aída Kemelmajer de Carlucci).

== Structure ==
The Argentine Civil and Commercial Code is organized into a systematic and hierarchical framework that ensures a comprehensive and accessible legal structure. It is composed of a Preliminary Title and Six Books, each subdivided into Titles, Chapters, and in some cases, Sections and Paragraphs. Each unit addresses a specific legal domain and is structured by article numbers for ease of reference.

=== Preliminary title ===
Covers foundational legal principles regarding the law, its interpretation, rights, exercise of rights, and legal goods, from articles 1 to 18.

- Chapter 1: Derecho (Law) – Articles 1 to 3
- Chapter 2: Ley (Law) – Articles 4 to 8
- Chapter 3: Ejercicio de los derechos (Exercise of Rights) – Articles 9 to 14
- Chapter 4: Derechos y bienes (Rights and Goods) – Articles 15 to 18

=== Book One: Parte General (General Part) ===
This book outlines the fundamental legal concepts concerning persons, property, legal acts, and the transmission of rights.

- Title I: Persona humana (Human Person) – Articles 19 to 140
- Title II: Persona jurídica (Legal Entity) – Articles 141 to 224
- Title III: Bienes (Goods) – Articles 225 to 256
- Title IV: Hechos y actos jurídicos (Legal Acts and Acts-in-Fact) – Articles 257 to 397
- Title V: Transmisión de los derechos (Transmission of Rights) – Articles 398 to 400

=== Book Two: Relaciones de Familia (Family Relationships) ===
Deals with the legal framework governing family life.

- Title I: Matrimonio (Marriage) – Articles 401 to 445
- Title II: Régimen patrimonial del matrimonio (Marital Property Regime) – Articles 446 to 508
- Title III: Uniones convivenciales (Cohabitation Unions) – Articles 509 to 528
- Title IV: Parentesco (Kinship) – Articles 529 to 557
- Title V: Filiación (Filiation) – Articles 558 to 593
- Title VI: Adopción (Adoption) – Articles 594 to 637
- Title VII: Responsabilidad parental (Parental Responsibility) – Articles 638 to 704
- Title VIII: Procesos de familia (Family Proceedings) – Articles 705 to 723

=== Book Three: Derechos Personales (Personal Rights) ===
Establishes the rules on obligations and contracts.

- Title I: Obligaciones en general (General Obligations) – Articles 724 to 956
- Title II: Contratos en general (General Contracts) – Articles 957 to 1091
- Title III: Contratos de consumo (Consumer Contracts) – Articles 1092 to 1122
- Title IV: Contratos en particular (Specific Contracts) – Articles 1123 to 1707
- Title V: Otras fuentes de las obligaciones (Other Sources of Obligations) – Articles 1708 to 1881

=== Book Four: Derechos Reales (Real Rights) ===
Focuses on property law and real rights.

- Title I: Disposiciones generales (General Provisions) – Articles 1882 to 1907
- Title II: Posesión y tenencia (Possession and Holding) – Articles 1908 to 1940
- Title III: Dominio (Ownership) – Articles 1941 to 1982
- Title IV: Condominio (Co-Ownership) – Articles 1983 to 2036
- Title V: Propiedad Horizontal (Horizontal Property) – Articles 2037 to 2072
- Title VI: Conjuntos inmobiliarios (Real Estate Complexes) – Articles 2073 to 2113
- Title VII: Superficie (Surface Rights) – Articles 2114 to 2128
- Title VIII: Usufructo – Articles 2129 to 2153
- Title IX: Uso (Use) – Articles 2154 to 2157
- Title X: Habitación (Habitation) – Articles 2158 to 2161
- Title XI: Servidumbre (Servitude) – Articles 2162 to 2183
- Title XII: Derechos reales de garantía (Real Security Rights) – Articles 2184 to 2237
- Title XIII: Acciones posesorias y reales (Possessory and Real Actions) – Articles 2238 to 2276

=== Book Five: Transmisión de Derechos por Causa de Muerte (Transmission of Rights Due to Death) ===
Addresses inheritance and succession law.

- Title I: Sucesiones (Successions) – Articles 2277 to 2285
- Title II: Aceptación y renuncia de la herencia (Acceptance and Renunciation of Inheritance) – Articles 2286 to 2301
- Title III: Cesión de herencia (Assignment of Inheritance) – Articles 2302 to 2309
- Title IV: Petición de herencia (Claim of Inheritance) – Articles 2310 to 2315
- Title V: Responsabilidad de herederos y legatarios. Liquidación del pasivo hereditario (Heirs and Legatees’ Responsibility) – Articles 2316 to 2322
- Title VI: Estado de indivisión (State of Indivision) – Articles 2323 to 2334
- Title VII: Proceso sucesorio (Probate Proceedings) – Articles 2335 to 2362
- Title VIII: Partición (Partition) – Articles 2363 to 2423
- Title IX: Sucesiones intestadas (Intestate Successions) – Articles 2424 to 2443
- Title X: Porción legítima (Forced Heirship) – Articles 2444 to 2461
- Title XI: Sucesiones testamentarias (Testamentary Successions) – Articles 2462 to 2531

=== Book Six: Disposiciones Comunes a los Derechos Personales y Reales (Common Provisions to Personal and Real Rights) ===
Contains shared rules and transitional provisions that apply jointly to the domains of personal and real rights.

=== Annex I ===
Reproduces the full text of the Preliminary Title, including detailed content of its articles (1 to 18), establishing essential interpretive guidelines and foundational civil law concepts.

== Reforms ==
The Argentine rental housing market was revolutionized by the issuance of DNU 70/2023 on 20 December 2023, under President Javier Milei. also officially named Bases para la Reconstrucción de la Economía Argentina, abolished the Ley de Alquileres (Law 27.551 and its amendment 27.737), returning control to the general provisions of the Civil and Commercial Code of Argentina (Código Civil y Comercial, CCC)."Decreto de Necesidad y Urgencia 70/2023". Boletín Oficial de la República Argentina. 21 December 2023."Decreto de Necesidad y Urgencia 70/2023". Boletín Oficial de la República Argentina. December 21, 2023.

The reforms introduced an emphasis on freedom of contract among landlords and tenants, which unstopped many regulation provisions that had been implemented to protect renters. A few of the alterations are liberalization of rent price adjustments, contract duration, payment currencies, and grounds for contract cancellations.

=== Partial reforms ===
Some of the key reforms in the DNU 70/2023 include:

- Currency of Payment: Rental agreements can now be expressed in any currency, including foreign currencies. Courts are prohibited from altering the agreed-upon currency of payment.
- Price Adjustment: Parties can agree on the indexation method for rent increases, public and private indices. In case of lack of agreement, the application of a similar official index is possible.
- Contract Term: The minimum rental agreement period is now established by agreement. When not established, the CCC defaults to two years for residential use and three years for commercial or other purposes.
- Security Deposit: The currency and amount of the deposit are negotiable, although the CCC still requires landlords to return it when the lease ends.
- Termination and Early Exit: Landlords can now terminate leases for any breach, and tenants can cancel contracts at will, as long as they pay 10% of the remaining rent. The prior six-month minimum before cancellation was eliminated.

These reforms were controversial. Those in favor believe that deregulation reestablishes market forces and limits distortions induced by overregulation by the state. Opponents say it undermines protection for tenants, especially in areas of high demand such as urban centers, and have challenged the constitutionality of the reforms.

== See also ==
- Civil code of Argentina
