= Vélez Sársfield =

Vélez Sársfield may refer to:

- Club Atlético Vélez Sarsfield, an Argentine sports club best known for its football team
  - José Amalfitani Stadium, the club's stadium, sometimes called "Vélez Sarsfield stadium"
- Dalmacio Vélez Sarsfield, Argentine jurist and editor of the Civil Code of Argentina
- Vélez Sársfield (barrio), a barrio in the Western part of Buenos Aires
- Aurelia Vélez Sársfield, Argentine writer
