= Law of Argentina =

The Legal system of Argentina is a civil law legal system. The pillar of the civil system is the Constitution of Argentina (1853).

The Argentine Constitution of 1853 was an attempt to unite the unstable and young country of the United Provinces of the Río de la Plata under a single law, creating, as well, the various institutions needed to run a country. This constitution was finally approved after failed attempts in 1813 (see Assembly of 1813), 1819, and 1831 (Pacto Federal).

== Structure of the Law in Argentina ==
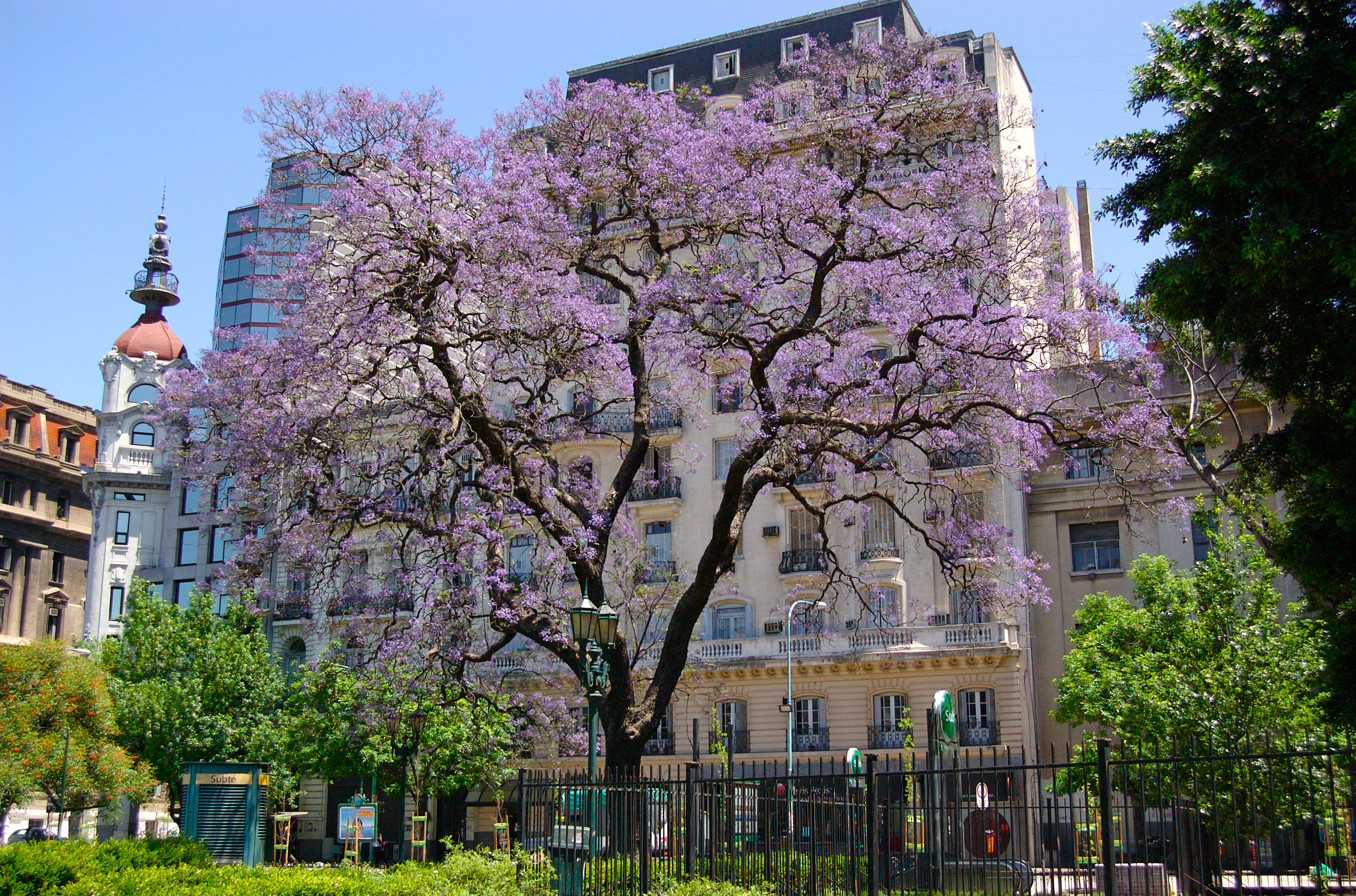
Jacarandá in bloom in Plaza Lavalle, the heart of Buenos Aires' legal district.

Constitution of Argentina
1. Bill of Rights
2. Form of Government
3. Delegation of Powers to the National
4. Precedence of Laws - International Treaties
5. Provincial Constitutions

Civil Code of Argentina

The first Civil Code was written by Argentine jurist Dalmacio Vélez Sársfield, and came into effect on 1 January 1871 and remained law until 1 August 2015, when it was replaced by a new Civil and Commercial Code - Código Civil y Comercial de la Nación.

The 1871 Argentine Civil Code was largely inspired by the Spanish legal tradition, and also by the Brazilian Civil Code, the Spanish Civil Code of 1851, the Napoleonic Code, and the Chilean Civil Code. The sources of this Civil Code also include various theoretical legal works, mainly of the great French jurists of the 19th century. It was the first civil law to adopt, as its cornerstone, consciously, the distinction between rights and obligations and between real property rights, thus distancing itself from the French model.

The new Código Civil y Comercial de la Nación brings many changes, in particular the modernization of family law.

Penal Code of Argentina

Argentine sources of law
1. Statutory Law
2. Case Law
3. Custom
4. General Principles of Law
5. Analogy
6. Equity

Argentine interpretation of legislation
1. Methods of Interpretation
2. Sources of Interpretation
3. Special Rules of Interpretation

Argentine law jurisdictions
1. Jurisdiction
2. Competence
3. Levels of Jurisdiction
4. Jurisdiction of the Argentine Courts in the International Sphere

== See also ==
- Legal systems of the world
- Politics of Argentina
