= Spanish Floor Clauses =

A Floor Clause, also known as ‘Clausula Suelo’ or ‘Suelo Hipotecario’, is simply a clause that has been inserted into variable rate mortgage agreements in Spain during the last 20 years that affects the interest rate payable on the mortgage. For most Spanish variable rate mortgages, the interest rate payable is calculated by reference rate to the Euro Interbank Offered Rate (Euribor) . If interest reference increases, then the interest on the mortgage also increases; likewise, if EURIBOR decreases, then interest payments will fall.

However, the insertion of the floor clause into the mortgage agreement means that mortgage holders do not fully benefit from the fall in EURIBOR as there will be a minimum rate of interest payable on the mortgage (also known as a "suelo"). The level of the floor will depend on the bank providing the mortgage and when the mortgage was taken out, but it is typical to see floors of 3- 4%.

This clause has been deemed by both the Spanish and European courts to be illegal, unfair and constituting ‘abusive’ practice.

It is estimated that there are more than 3.5 million mortgages affected.

The main banks affected are Banco Popular, Unicaja and Banco de Sabadell.

== Courts rule against floor clauses ==
=== Spanish Supreme Court Resolution on 9 May 2013 ===
The Supreme Court ruled Floor Clauses were null and void and abusive, among other reasons, due to their lack of transparency. It is understood that there has been transparency if the information was clear and the client had the ability to understand its contents and consequences.

The judgment contained an injunction that obligated the withdrawal of floor clauses from some mortgage loan agreements and the payment of redress to the clients for the overpaid amounts only from the date of the sentence. The main banks affected by this sentence were BBVA (400,000 mortgages), Novagalicia Banco (90,000 mortgages) and CajaMar (100,000).

This sentence set down case law for future claims. However, it opened a long legal battle to get a full refund for the overpaid amounts since the outset of the mortgage loan. That is because the limitation of the retroactivity to the sentence's date redress goes against the Spanish Civil Code.

=== Spanish Supreme Court Resolution on 21 December 2016 ===
The European Court of Justice ruled in favour of the customer and against the limitation of the retroactivity in a Prejudicial Question on 21 December 2016. That means that the European Court of Justice set out that the bank should return all overpaid amounts from the outset of the mortgage.

== Current Situation ==
=== Royal-Decree Law 1/2017 of 20 January, about urgent measures to protect consumers in Floor clause matters. ===
The Spanish Government passed a new legislation on 20 January to set a pre-judicial process to claim the overpaid amounts. According to the Royal-Decree Law, the affected customers can lodge a complaint to the bank to claim the overpaid amounts due to the floor clause. Once the client has submitted the claim, the bank has up to three months to accept the complaint and return the overpaid amount. If the bank rejects the claim, the client can bring actions to the court to claim for the overpaid amounts. This process is not mandatory for the customers and it can take actions to the court directly.

Only 37.5% of the affected customers have reached an agreement with the bank throughout this system. However, according to the General Council of the Judiciary, 98.3% of judicial sentences about floor clauses are in favour of the client. Additionally, there are some regions where all judicial resolutions have been ruled in favour of the client, among those Malaga, Murcia, Santa Cruz de Tenerife and Barcelona.
