= Uruguayan Aeronautical Law Code =

1942 Council of State
- Long title: Aeronautical Law Code
- Citation: Decree Law No. 10288 at IMPO
- Territorial extent: Uruguay
- Enacted by: 1942 Council of State
- Enacted: 1 October 1942
- Assented to: 3 December 1942
- Effective: 3 March 1943

Repealed by
- 1974 Uruguayan Aeronautical Code

Keywords
- aviation law
- Status: Repealed

Aeronautical Law Code (Spanish: Código de Legislación Aeronáutica) was a legal code that codified the rules about aeronautical law matters in Uruguay. It was promulgated on 3 December 1942 and came into force on 3 March 1943. It was repealed by the 1974 Aeronautical Code, which superseded it and updated Uruguayan laws on aviation.

== Description ==
The Aeronautical Law Code was inspired by similar laws on the matter of other countries, such as the 1938 Brazilian Air Code, the 1924 French Aeronautical Law, in addition to the 1919 Paris Convention relating to the regulation of aerial navigation and its annexes. It also inspired other later aeronautical law codes in Latin America. It was approved by Decree Law No. 10288 of 3 December 1942 (Ministry of National Defense's Decree No. 1877) after being enacted by the Council of State in October.

During its time of legal force it ruled the aeronautical activity in order to provide legal certainty in that matter. However, with the passing of time in later decades, it was becoming more obsolete due to the progresses in aeronautical industry, politics and law, locally and internationally.

A feature of this code was that it distinguished between "public aviation law" and "private aviation law". The Aeronautical Law Code consisted of a Preliminar Title, a book on Public Aviation Law, another on Private Aviation Law and the last book was about miscellaneous issues such as cautionary measures (injunctions), remedies and other judiciary procedures.

== Contents ==
=== Application of aeronautical law ===
The code provided that the application of aeronautical law and its administrative supervision was in charge of the Ministry of Defense's Civilian Aeronautical Directorate. This provision was founded on "the value of the aeronautical elements as part of the military safety of the State", on economic reasons as the supervision of the aeronautical activity was not scattered in several agencies, on analogy with the maritime sector regulations, to center all the services related to the defense of sovereignty under this ministry, and because the volume of civilian aviation of that time did not require another supervision structure.

On lacunae in the aeronautical law, the Code provided in its article 183 that the legal lacunae should be filled with the application of the general laws as long as they did not collide with the Code's provisions.

=== Aerial sovereignty and property of air space ===
Regarding the sovereignty of airspace, the Code established the principle of recognition of the sovereignty of the State over its airpace, whether on its territorial lands or on its territorial waters, in line with the criteria established by the 1919 Paris Convention Relating to the Regulation of Aerial Navigation.

On the legal status of airspace and the vertical extension of the right of property, article 76, based on the French law and doctrine, rules that the land owner could not oppose to the flights that were not performed in abuse of rights, the latter understood as the flights that were done under infraction of the Code's provisions and its related regulations. Therefore, the individual's interests whose lands were overflown should be in line with the principle established by article 6, which stated that "air travel is considered of public utility". But unlike the theories about abuse of rights on the surface as it happens with the automotive travel, this Code established as a general rule the freedom of air circulation and the use of the air space on top of the lands, with no other limitation than the abuse of rights that the ones who are flying could commit.

=== Aircraft ===
This Code defined in its article 13 the aircraft as "any device intended for the air transport of people or things". Nevertheless, this definition was criticized because things such as parachutes could not be considered as "aircraft", because they can transport a person through the air although vertically, and this definition would also be questionable because it could allow to include objects such as projectiles globos, or probes, even though if they could transport people or goods. They were classified according to their nature and the class of service performed: public aircraft were the military aircraft and the country's aircraft providing a public service, although private aircraft could be considered public if they were performing a public service, during that time. The other aircraft were considered private, that were, those that were not military nor performed a public service, being owned by the State or individuals, or those that their purpose were the commercial transportation. Among the private aircraft, the Code featured the commercial aircraft, aimed at air transport of people or goods for profit, private aircraft, used as non profit regardless of their owner, which could include those whose purpose was healthcare, scientific activities, education, tourism, or sports. The Code makes a special distinction of sanitary aircraft, those whose intended use was for health services, to be considered deserving of a special legal status.

On the law applicable aboard the aircraft, the Aeronautical Law Code determined in its article 3 that were subject to Uruguayan laws all actions and facts "produced aboard of aircrafts [sic] in flight over the national territory, its territorial waters or the corresponding atmospheric space", however it did not discriminated between national and foreign aircraft according to the principle of the aircraft flag in flight over the national territory. But to foreign military aircraft and their crew in the national territory it was applicable the rights and immunities granted by the national laws and international treaties applicable to foreign warships in Uruguayan territorial waters.

== See also ==
- Law of Uruguay — overview of current laws of Uruguay
- PLUNA — former flag carrier of Uruguay
- Uruguayan Air Force — military force of Uruguay guarding the air space of the country

== Bibliography ==
- Bauzá Araújo, Álvaro (1955). Principios de Derecho Aéreo (in Spanish). Montevideo: Universidad de la República (Facultad de Derecho). p. 207. OCLC 12376283.
- Bauzá Araújo, Álvaro (1976). Tratado de Derecho Aeronáutico (in Spanish). Vol. 1. Montevideo: Amalio M. Fernández. p. 332. OCLC 2982031.
- Gaggero, Eduardo D. (1976). Temas de Derecho Aeronáutico (in Spanish). Montevideo: Fundación de Cultura Universitaria. p. 160. OCLC 2982026.
