= Blixen =

Blixen can refer to the following,

- Baron Bror von Blixen-Finecke, Swedish born African big game hunter, commonly known as Bror Blixen.
- Carlos Blixen, Uruguayan basketball player, Olympic medalist in 1956
- Hans von Blixen-Finecke, and his son, Hans von Blixen-Finecke, Jr., both Olympic medal winners in equestrian events.
- Hyalmar Blixen, Uruguayan writer
- Karen Blixen, Danish born novelist.
- 3318 Blixen a main belt asteroid, named after the novelist.
