= Hugo Fernández Faingold =

Uruguayan politician (1947–2025)

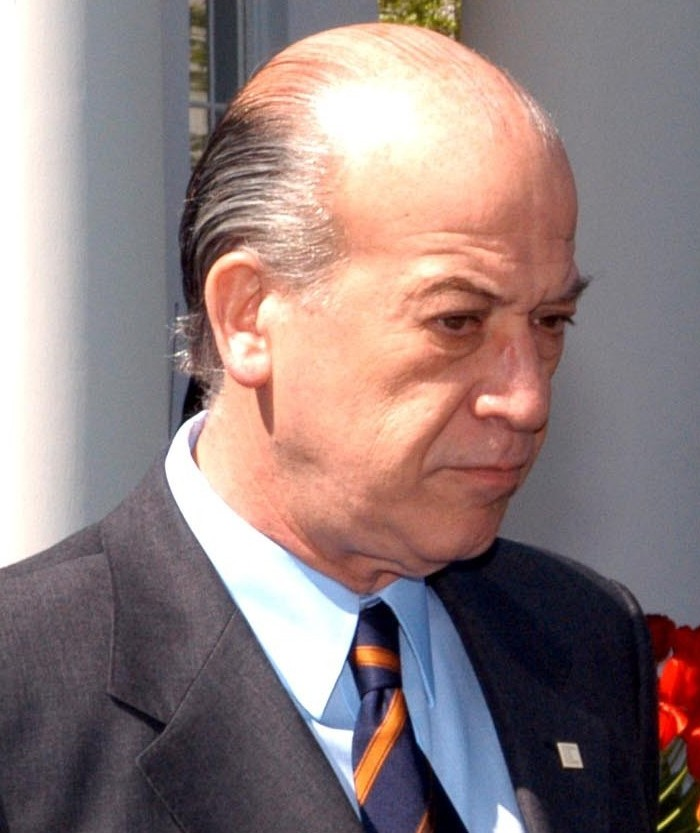
Faingold in 2003

Hugo Fernández Faingold (1 March 1947 – 22 May 2025) was a Uruguayan politician, who served as Vice President of Uruguay from 1998 to 2000.

== Background ==
Fernández Faingold belonged to the Uruguayan Colorado Party. He was the son of historian and Colorado Party (Uruguay) trade unionist Hugo Fernández Artucio and Julia Faingold.

He was married to Ana María Renna Valdez, and they had six children; he divorced in 2003. After he married Verónica Cortavarria they had 2 children. At the time of his death, he was married to Analia Barrientos.

== Political career ==
During the first presidency of Julio María Sanguinetti he served as Ministry of Labour and Social Welfare. He later served as Vice President of Uruguay from 1998 to 2000, in the second Administration of President Julio María Sanguinetti, succeeding Hugo Batalla, who died in office.

=== Historical note ===
Fernández was the twelfth person to hold the office of Vice President of Uruguay. The office dates from 1934, when Alfredo Navarro became Uruguay's first Vice President.

== Subsequent events ==
Fernández Faingold was himself succeeded as Vice President by Luis Antonio Hierro López in 2000.

He subsequently served as Uruguayan Ambassador to the United States from 2000 to 2005.

== Death ==
Fernández Faingold died on 22 May 2025, at the age of 78.

== See also ==
- Politics of Uruguay
- List of political families#Uruguay

Political offices
Preceded by Hugo Batalla	Vice President of Uruguay; 3 October 1998 – 1 March 2000	Succeeded by Luis Antonio Hierro López
Diplomatic posts
Preceded by Alvaro Diez de Medina	Uruguayan Ambassador to the United States; May 2000 – July 2005	Succeeded by Carlos Gianelli
