= Hyalmar Blixen =

Uruguayan poet, novelist and essayist

- Born: 3 October 1916; Montevideo, Uruguay
- Died: 17 February 2007 (aged 90); Montevideo, Uruguay
- Occupations: Poet, novelist
- Relatives: Josefina Lerena Acevedo (mother); Eduardo Acevedo Maturana (2x great grandfather); Eduardo Acevedo Díaz (great-uncle)

Hyalmar Blixen Lerena (3 October 1916 – 17 February 2007) was a Uruguayan poet, novelist and essayist.

He was born in Montevideo in 1917 into a cultured family, the eldest of four children. His father, Mario Blixen Claret (1883–1939), was the Minister of Finance, and his mother, Josefina Lerena Acevedo de Blixen (1889–1967), was a writer and poet. Her great-grandfather was Eduardo Acevedo Maturana and her uncle was Eduardo Acevedo Díaz. His siblings were Julio (1918–1994), Olaf Blixen (born 1922), a noted anthropologist, and Sonia (born 1926).

He taught for many years at the Instituto de Estudios Superiores (Institute of Higher Studies) in Montevideo. Alongside his novels and poems, he also published numerous essays in the journals El Dia and Lea. He received several prizes during his lifetime. He died in 2007.

== Novels ==
- Los Iporá (1939)
- Bajo los 13 cielos (1972)
- Aquel año 3, Tochtli (1974)
- Antes del amanecer (1984)

== Poetry ==
- Instantes del viento (1965)
- La rosa de cien colores (1977)
