= Civil Code of Paraguay =

The Civil Code of Paraguay dates from 1877 and reflects the influence of Continental Law. Like other countries of Latin America, it is inspired in the Code Napoleon. Its first version, in force until 1987, was almost a copy of the Civil Code of Argentina. In this sense, the long-lasting legacy of Argentine lawyer Dalmacio Vélez Sarsfield is still revered among Latin American jurists.

== See also ==
- Civil Code of Argentina

== Bibliography ==
- Silva Alonso, Ramón (2000). Vélez Sarsfield en el nuevo Código Civil paraguayo (PDF) (in Spanish). Academia Nacional de Derecho y Ciencias Sociales de Córdoba.
