= Luisi =

Luisi is an Italian surname. Notable people with the surname include:

- Antonio Luisi (born 1994), Luxembourgish footballer
- Carlo Luisi (born 1977), Italian footballer
- Clotilde Luisi (1882–1969), Uruguayan lawyer
- Fabio Luisi (born 1959), Italian conductor
- Gianluca Luisi (born 1970), Italian classical pianist
- Hector Luisi (1919–2013), Uruguayan politician
- James Luisi (1928–2002), American basketball player and actor
- Paulina Luisi (1875–1945), Uruguayan feminist
- Pier Luigi Luisi (born 1938), Italian chemist
- Zebastian Lucky Luisi (born 1984), New Zealand rugby league player
