= Aída Kemelmajer =

Argentine judge

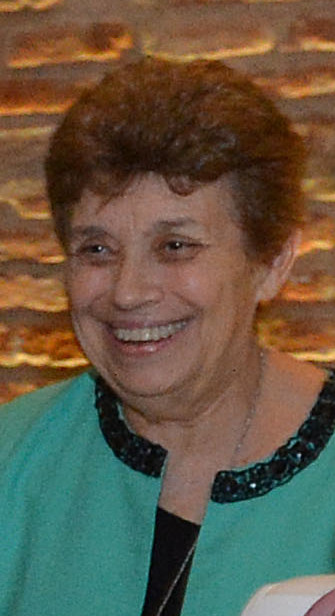
- Kemelmajer in 2012

Justice of the Supreme Court of Mendoza
- In office 1984 – 1 May 2010
- Appointed by: Santiago Llaver

Personal details
- Born: Aída R. Kemelmajer; 4 November 1945 (age 80) San Martín, Mendoza
- Education: University of Mendoza
- Awards: Konex Award (2016)
- Workplace: National University of Cuyo

Aída R. Kemelmajer de Carlucci (born 4 November 1945) is an Argentine jurist, lawyer, and author. She was a Justice of the Supreme Court of Mendoza from 1984 to 2010. Kemelmajer was a member of the drafting commission of the updated Commercial and Civil Codes of Argentina. Born in San Martín, Mendoza, Kemelmajer earned a PhD in Law and Social Sciences the University of Mendoza. She was a tenured professor of civil law at the School of Law of the National University of Cuyo.

== Early life and education ==
Aída R. Kemelmajer was born on 4 November 1945 in San Martín, Mendoza to Jaique and Miguel Kemelmajer. As a teenager, she was a castmember of the theater of the Faculty of Economic Sciences of the National University of Cuyo.

She earned her PhD in Law and Social Sciences from the University of Mendoza.

== Legal career ==
Governor of Mendoza Santiago Llaver appointed Kemelmajer to be the Supreme Court of Justice of Mendoza in 1984. She was the first Jew to join the court. Kemelmajer was a judge of the Supreme Court of Justice of Mendoza Province from 1984 to 2010.

Kemelmajer called for the decriminalization of abortion. In a 2006 case, she ruled that a public hospital, which refused to comply with provisions of article 86 of the Penal Code of Argentina, was required to terminate the pregnancy of a disabled and abused young woman.

Kemelmajer was a tenured professor of civil law at the School of Law of the National University of Cuyo. She taught private law at the university's School of Economic Sciences. She also taught postgraduate courses at universities in various European and Latin American countries. She was a contracted professor at the University I, II, X and XII of Paris, Genoa and Bologna. She was a professor of the Master in Bioethics and Law at the University of Barcelona, where she held membership in the university's Observatory of Bioethics and Law.

Kemelmajer was a member of the drafting commission of the updated Commercial and Civil Codes of Argentina, which have been in force since 2015. She was also part of a study commission for the unification of procedural norms for UNIDROIT and a UNESCO group on the precautionary principle. Kemelmajer is a member of the Scientific Committee of the International Union of Judicial Officers and the National Committee for Ethics in Science and Technology.

Kemelmajer has published dozens of books and more than 400 monographic articles. She has also conducted training courses for judges in Argentina and other Latin American countries.

== Awards ==
Kemelmajer received a Diamond Konex Award in 2016. She has received degrees of Doctor Honoris Causa from universities in Argentina, Peru, and France.

== Selected publications ==
- La separación de hecho entre cónyuges
- La capacidad civil del menor que trabaja
- Los privilegios en el proceso concursal
- La responsabilidad civil en el derecho de familia
- La cláusula penal”; “Derecho real de superficie
- Temas modernos de responsabilidad civil
- Daños causados por dependientes
- Responsabilidad del Estado por los errores judiciales
- Protección jurídica de la vivienda familiar
- Calificación registral de los documentos que tienen origen en decisiones judiciales
- Justicia Restaurativa
- El nuevo Derecho de Familia
- Alimentos

== Personal life ==
Kemelmajer married lawyer Nedo Carlucci in 1968. She has two children, Fabiana and Leandro.
