= Hugo Fernández Artucio =

Uruguayan teacher of philosophy, historian and politician

Hugo Fernández Artucio (born 1912, died 5/2/1974) was a Uruguayan teacher of philosophy, historian and politician.

== Earlier career ==
He was an editor of Free World magazine in New York City. He fought for two years in the Lincoln Brigade during the Spanish Civil War and was made prisoner by Francoists.

He wrote the book Nazis in Uruguay (Buenos Aires, 1940) where he denounced the activities of Nazis in Uruguay. He also wrote "The Nazi Underground in South America" (New York, Farrar & Rinehart, 1942)., with the approval of Charles de Gaulle.

He was a member of the Special Committee for Palestine in Uruguay, supporting the creation of the State of Israel.

== Socialist Party leadership ==
He was secretary-general of the Socialist Party of Uruguay, which he left after the Molotov–Ribbentrop pact was signed. After that he adopted a socialist-anarchist attitude.

== Later conservative phase; link with Colorado Party ==
Some time after that he adhered to Batllism, organizing the Acción Gremial Batllista.

Married with Julia Faingold, he had four children: Hugo (who served as Vice President of Uruguay), Julio, María Raquel and Elsa.

== See also ==
- List of political families#Uruguay
