= Feria de Tristán Narvaja =

Street market in Montevideo, Uruguay

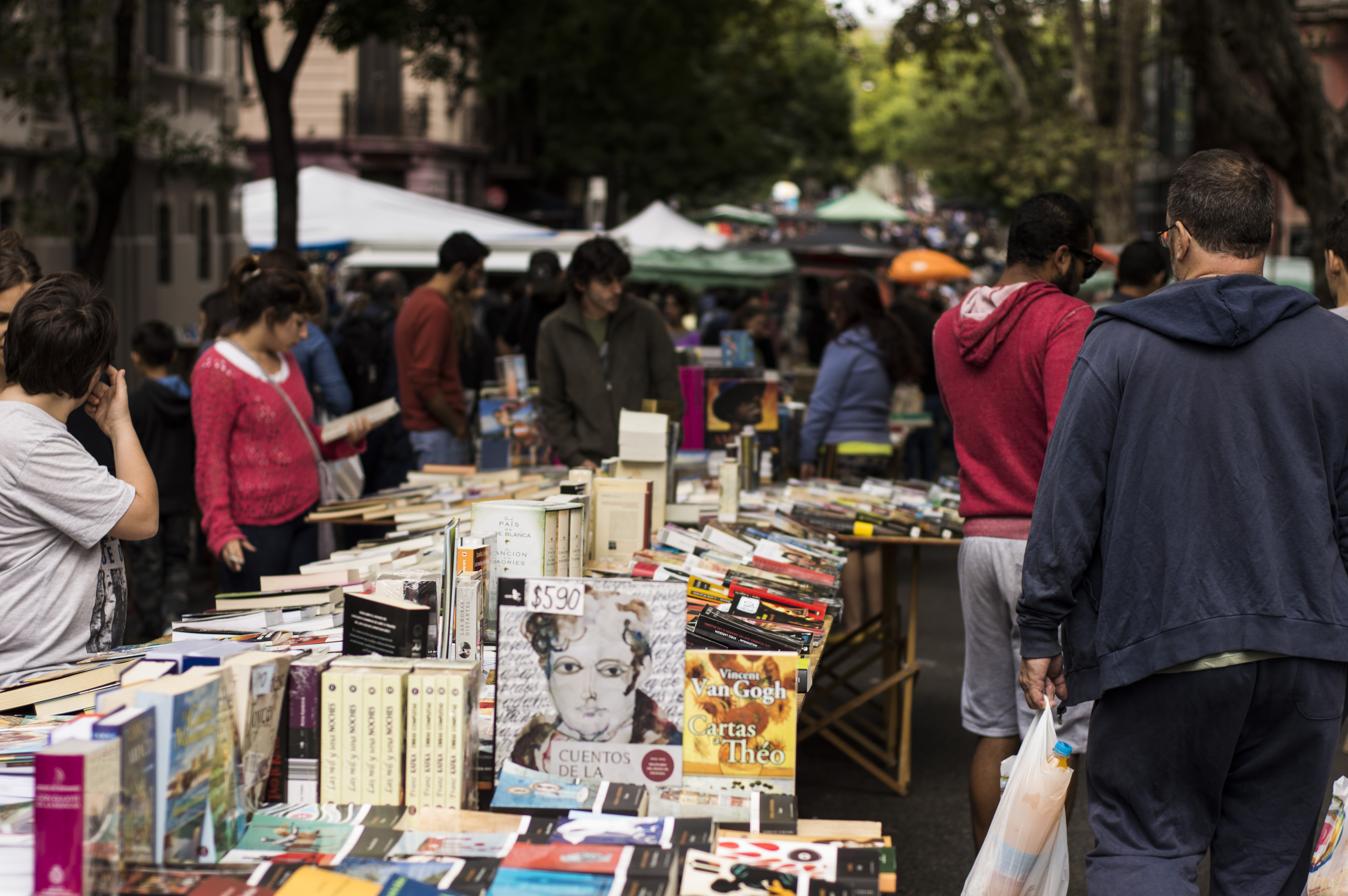
Tristán Narvaja Fair

Tristán Narvaja street market (in Spanish, Feria de Tristán Narvaja) is a traditional street market that takes place every Sunday in Montevideo.

In the middle of Cordón neighbourhood, Tristán Narvaja street (which honors the 19th century lawmaker) stretches from 18 de Julio Avenue through La Paz street. It lodges several bookstores and antique shops; and every Sunday, from very early in the morning till mid-afternoon, it fills with salespeople and public.

It is the Montevidean equivalent of a flea market. Furniture, antique items, pets, books, as well as food, fruit and vegetables, are to be found there. Many foreigners come here in search for rare objects.
