= Álvaro Melián Lafinur =

Argentine poet and critic

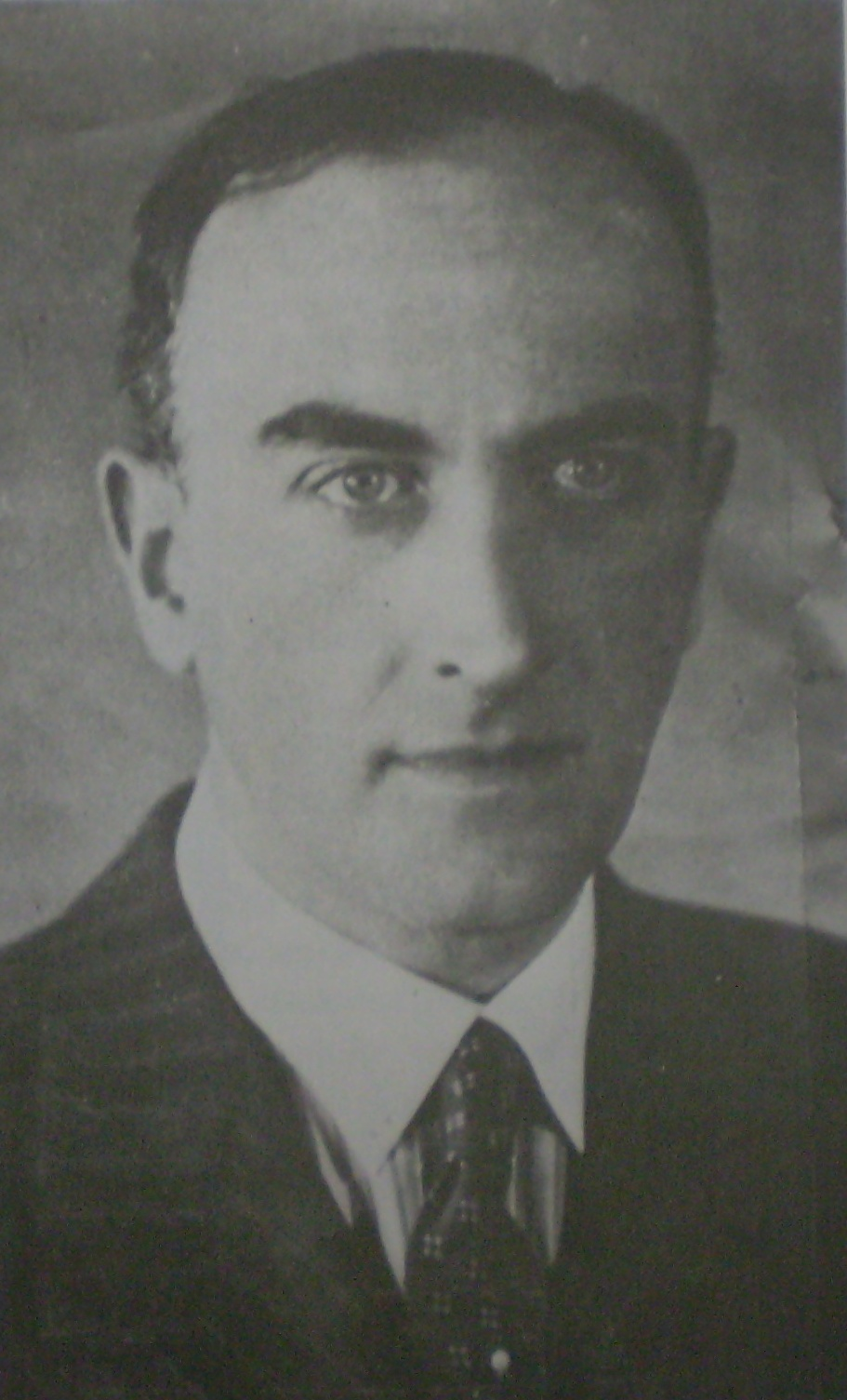
- Álvaro Melián Lafinur

Álvaro Octavio Melián Lafinur (16 May 1893 – 1958) was an Argentine poet and critic.

Born in Buenos Aires in 1893, he was the son of the Uruguayan lawyer and writer Luis Melián Lafinur and also the second cousin of writer Jorge Luis Borges. In 1910, while working at the Spanish newspaper El País, he published Borges' work, a translation of Oscar Wilde's The Happy Prince, for the first time.
