= Juan Cuestas =

Uruguayan diplomat

Juan Cuestas was a Uruguayan diplomat.

== Background ==
Juan Cuestas's father Juan Lindolfo Cuestas served two terms as President of Uruguay at the end of the 19th and beginning of the 20th centuries.

== Career ==
Juan Cuestas was a prominent diplomat, appointed Uruguay's first Ambassador to Mexico in 1901. He was previously Minister to Washington, DC, United States.

Being from a culture where political families are common, Juan Cuestas was considered to have Presidential leadership prospects, though they never came to fruition.

== See also ==
- List of political families#Uruguay
- List of Uruguayan Ambassadors to the United States#Uruguayan Ministers Plenipotentiary to the United_States
