= Luis Melián Lafinur =

Uruguayan politician (1850–1939)

Luis Melián Lafinur (10 January 1850 – 27 February 1939) was a Uruguayan jurist, essayist, professor and politician. He was the son of Bernardo Melián and Florencia Lafinur. His son was the Argentine poet Álvaro Melián Lafinur.

== Biography ==
He earned a Doctor of Laws degree from the University of Buenos Aires in 1870. He took up arms at least twice, once in 1886 as part of the ultimately unsuccessful Revolution of Quebracho, and again in 1904 in support of the government as a battalion commander in the National Guard during the unsuccessful revolution led by Aparicio Saravia.

He represented Uruguay at the 1906 Pan-American Conference in Rio de Janeiro, and was simultaneously appointed Minister to the United States, Mexico, and Cuba. He was also editor of two newspapers, El Plata and La Razón.

From 1908 to 1909, he was the president of the Atheneum of Montevideo.

He was an uncle of the famous Argentine author Jorge Luis Borges, and is referenced in Borges' story "Funes, the Memorious," where his name is one of the numbers in Funes' new numbering system:

In place of seven thousand thirteen, he would say (for example) Máximo Perez; in place of seven thousand fourteen, The Train; other numbers were Luis Melián Lafinur, Olimar, Brimstone, Clubs, The Whale, Gas, The Cauldron, Napoleon, Agustín de Vedia.

He also appears in Borges' short poem "The Dagger", which begins:

A dagger rests in a drawer.

It was forged in Toledo at the end of the last century. Luis Melián Lafinur gave it to my father, who brought it from Uruguay. Evaristo Carriego once held it in his hand.

Diplomatic posts
Preceded by Eduardo Acevedo Diaz	Uruguayan Minister to the United States; December 1906 – 31 May 1911	Succeeded by Carlos Maria de Pena
