= Antonio F. Díaz =

Spanish politician, journalist (1789–1869)

General Antonio Felipe Díaz
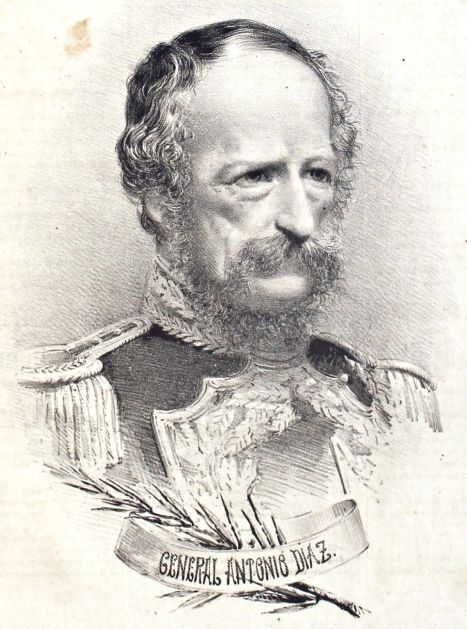

Minister of Finance and of War and the Navy of the Gobierno del Cerrito
- In office 1843–1851
- President: Manuel Oribe

Minister of Finance and of War and the Navy of Uruguay
- In office 1838–1838
- President: Manuel Oribe
- Preceded by: ?
- Succeeded by: ?

Personal details
- Born: Antonio Felipe Díaz de Castañon y Hernández; 26 March 1789 A Coruña, Spain
- Died: 12 September 1869 (aged 80) Montevideo, Uruguay
- Party: Partido Nacional
- Spouse: María Dionisia Gómez Soriano
- Relatives: Eduardo Acevedo Díaz (grandson)
- Occupation: army politician writer journalist
- Profession: military man

Military service
- Allegiance: (Spanish Empire) Spain — until 1810 (Argentina) United Provinces of the River Plate; Estado Oriental del Uruguay (1828–1838); Argentine Confederation (1838–1843); Cerrito Government (1843–1851); Uruguayan Republic
- Years of service: (1807–1865)
- Battles/wars: British invasions of the River Plate; Battle of Las Piedras; Cisplatine War; Great Siege of Montevideo

Antonio Felipe Díaz (26 March 1789 – 12 September 1869) was a Uruguayan general and politician, who participated in the Argentine War of Independence and the Guerra Grande in the Banda Oriental. He was also a writer and journalist, author of several newspapers, including El Correo Nacional and El Defensor de la Independencia Americana.

He briefly served as a cabinet minister during the presidency of Manuel Oribe in 1838, during his term as president of the Cerrito Government, serving as Minister of Finance and of War and the Navy of Uruguay.

Born in La Coruña, Spain, as the son of Domingo Díaz de Castañón and Manuela Hernández de Miera, he belonged to a distinguished Spanish family established in Buenos Aires and Montevideo. He was married to María Dionisia Gómez Soriano, daughter of José Gómez Soriano and Cayetana Tadea Torres.
