= List of ambassadors of Uruguay to the United States =

The Ambassador to the United States is the chief diplomat representing Uruguay in the United States. The Uruguayan legation to the United States was opened June 13, 1900, with most representatives holding the title Envoy Extraordinary and Minister Plenipotentiary (or Minister). It was upgraded to a full embassy on September 3, 1941, with representatives holding the title Ambassador Extraordinary and Plenipotentiary (or Ambassador).

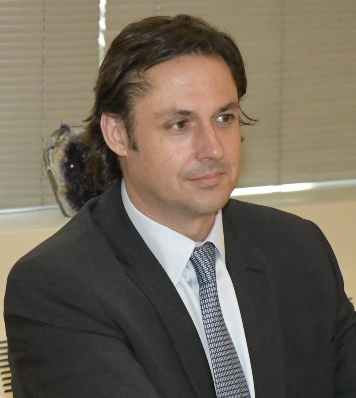
Andrés Durán Hareau, ambassador since 2020

The current embassy building, opened in 2001, is located at 1913 I Street NW, Washington, DC, 20006.

== Uruguayan Ministers Plenipotentiary to the United States ==
Name	Appointed	Notes
Juan Cuestas	June 13, 1900	Minister Resident
Luis Alberto de Herrera	November 1902	Chargé d'affaires a.i.
Eduardo Acevedo Diaz	February 1904	
Luis Melián Lafinur	December 1906	
Carlos Maria de Pena	May 31, 1911	
Hugo V. de Pena	April 30, 1918	Chargé d'affaires a.i.
Pedro Cosio	November 21, 1918	
Jacobo Varela	October 4, 1919	
José Richling	March 29, 1934	

== Uruguayan Ambassadors to the United States ==
Name	Diplomatic agrément, appointed	Diplomatic accreditation	Notes
Juan Carlos Blanco	August 25, 1941		
José Antonio Mora	May 3, 1948	Chargé d'affaires a.i.	
Alberto Domínguez-Cámpora	November 30, 1948		
José Antonio Mora	December 26, 1950	Chargé d'affaires a.i.	
José Antonio Mora	March 15, 1951		
Julio A. Lacarte Muró	September 24, 1956		
Carlos A. Clulow	January 29, 1960		
Juan Felipe Yriart	September 23, 1963		
Hector Luisi	January 31, 1969		
José Pérez Caldas	November 26, 1974		
Jorge Pacheco Areco	May 15, 1980		
Alejandro Vegh Villegas	July 30, 1982		
Italo L. Sordo Alonso	December 9, 1983	Chargé d'affaires a.i.	
Walter Ravenna	March 2, 1984		
Hector Luisi	September 5, 1985		
Eduardo Mac Gillycuddy	September 27, 1990		
Alvaro Diez de Medina	July 1995		
Hugo Fernández Faingold	May 2000		
Carlos Gianelli	July 2005		
Carlos Pita	2012		
Carlos Gianelli	July 23, 2015	August 3, 2015	
Andrés Durán Hareau	June 2020		

== See also ==
- Politics of Uruguay
