= List of ambassadors of Uruguay to Belgium =

Coordinates: 50.814833°N 4.377624°E

Ambassador of Uruguay to Belgium
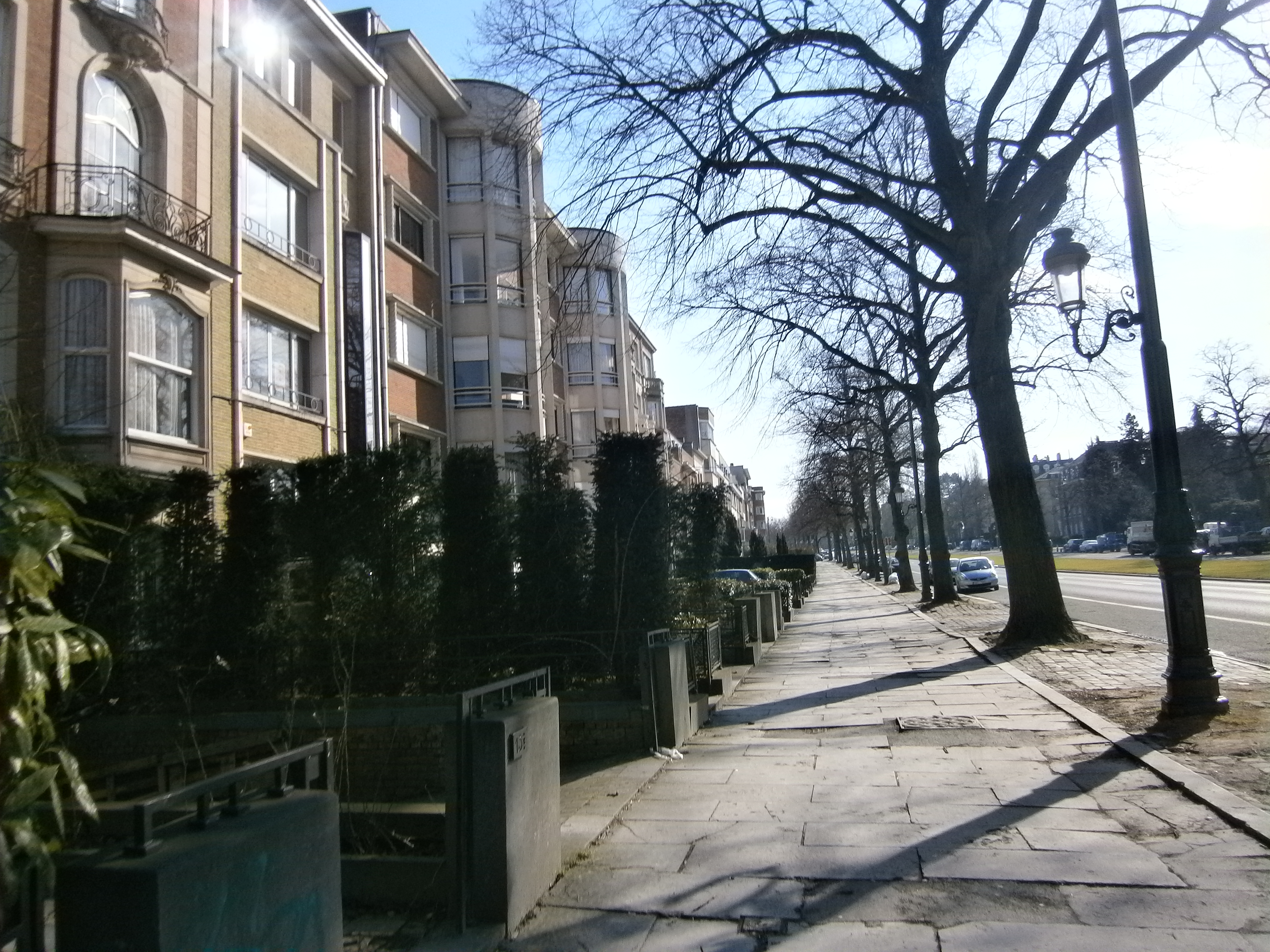
- Inaugural holder: Julio Lacarte Muró
- Formation: February 22, 1963

The Uruguayan ambassador in the City of Brussels is the official representative of the Government in Montevideo to the Government of Belgium.

== List of representatives ==
| Diplomatic agrément/Diplomatic accreditation | Ambassador | Observations | List of presidents of Uruguay | Prime Minister of Belgium | Term end |
|---|---|---|---|---|---|
| 1913 | Alberto Guani | | Claudio Williman | Charles de Broqueville | |
| 1926 | Manuel Bernárdez | | José Serrato | Prosper Poullet | |
| February 22, 1963 | Julio Lacarte Muró | | Daniel Fernández Crespo | Théo Lefèvre | |
| November 24, 1966 | Tomas R. Salomoni | Tomas Andres Salomini | Alberto Héber Usher | Paul Vanden Boeynants | |
| September 15, 1969 | Federico Grundwaldt-Ramasso | | Jorge Pacheco Areco | Gaston Eyskens | |
| January 16, 1979 | Gustavo Magariños Morales de los Rios | | Aparicio Méndez | Wilfried Martens | |
| September 4, 1984 | Miguel Jorge Berthet | | Gregorio Álvarez | Wilfried Martens | |
| November 7, 1989 | José María Araneo | | Julio María Sanguinetti | Wilfried Martens | |
| March 7, 1996 | Guillermo Eduardo Vallés Galmes | | Julio María Sanguinetti | Jean-Luc Dehaene | |
| November 16, 2000 | Jorge Rodolfo Talice | | Jorge Batlle Ibáñez | Guy Verhofstadt | |
| May 6, 2003 | Elbio Oscar Rosselli Frieri | | Jorge Batlle Ibáñez | Guy Verhofstadt | |
| November 6, 2006 | Luis Alfredo Sica Bergara | | Tabaré Vázquez | Guy Verhofstadt | |
| November 24, 2010 | Walter Cancela | | José Mujica | Yves Leterme | |
| April 16, 2016 | Carlos Rafael Pérez del Castillo | | Tabaré Vázquez | Charles Michel | 2020 |
