= José Pérez Caldas =

Uruguayan Brigadier General

2th Commander-in-Chief of the Uruguayan Air Force
- In office March 6, 1970 – March 5, 1974
- President: Jorge Pacheco Areco; Juan María Bordaberry
- Preceded by: Danilo E. Sena
- Succeeded by: Dante Paladini

Ambassador of Uruguay to the United States
- In office November 26, 1974 – 1980
- President: Juan María Bordaberry
- Preceded by: Héctor Luisi
- Succeeded by: Jorge Pacheco Areco

Personal details
- Born: October 30, 1917 Melo, Uruguay
- Died: June 14, 2004
- Education: Military School of Aeronautics

Military service
- Allegiance: Uruguayan Air Force
- Branch/service: Uruguayan Army; Aeronáutica Militar; Uruguayan Air Force
- Years of service: 1940 – 1974
- Rank: Brigadier General
- Commands: Uruguayan Air Force General Command
- Awards: Medal of Aeronautical Merit

José Pérez Caldas (October 30, 1917 — June 14, 2004) was a Uruguayan Brigadier General who served as the second Commander-in-Chief of the Uruguayan Air Force between March 1970 and March 1974. In February 1973, he opposed the appointment of retired Uruguayan General Antonio Francese to occupy the position of Minister of National Defense by President Juan María Bordaberry. As a result, he began to ignore the orders of the political power, within the context of the institutional crisis that led to the 1973 Uruguayan coup d'état.

== Early life ==
Caldas studied primary and secondary education in Melo, Cerro Largo Department. Upon completing his studies, he entered the Military School of the Uruguayan Army, graduating as Alférez (Ensign) of Infantry in 1940. Then, in 1941, he received his military wings.

== Military career ==
In March 1970 he was appointed Commander-in-Chief of the Uruguayan Air Force, succeeding Brigadier Danilo E. Sena, who was the first Commander of the Uruguayan Air Force, after this maximum position of Commander-in-Chief in the Air Force was renamed from General Inspector of the Uruguayan Air Force.

On September 9, 1971, Caldas was instructed by President Jorge Pacheco Areco, to conduct, along with the Uruguayan Army and Navy, anti-guerrilla operations against the Movimiento de Liberación Nacional-Tupamaros urban guerrilla.

In March 1974 he retired from the Air Force, and on November 26, 1974, he was appointed as Ambassador of Uruguay to the governments of the United States and Canada.

== Flight Information ==
Rating: Command Pilot

Aircraft Flown: DH.82, T-6D, C-47A, B-25J
