= Aurelia Vélez Sársfield =

Argentine writer (1836–1924)

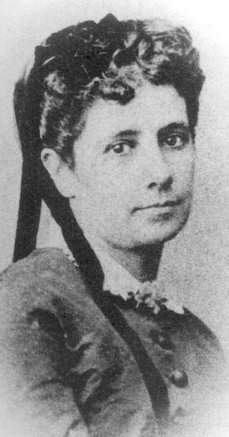
- Born: June 8, 1836; Buenos Aires, Argentina
- Died: December 6, 1924 (aged 88); Buenos Aires, Argentina
- Occupation: Writer
- Father: Dalmacio Vélez Sarsfield

Aurelia Vélez Sarsfield (8 June 1836 — 6 December 1924) was an Argentine writer.

== Biography ==
Aurelia Vélez Sarsfield was born in Buenos Aires on 8 June 1836, the second daughter of the legislator Dalmacio Vélez Sársfield. Her mother was Manuela Velázquez Piñero. From her early years, she received a good education. This, coupled with the teachings of her father, led her to become a secretary, which assisted her when drafting of the Código Civil de Argentina of 1869. At the age of seventeen, in 1857, she married her cousin, Dr. Pedro Ortiz Vélez, who was the son of the secretary of Facundo Quiroga. Their marriage lasted only a few months, due to her infidelity. After the breakup, Sarsfield returned to her parents home. The separation of Domingo Faustino Sarmiento and his wife, Benita Martínez Pastoriza, occurred when Benita discovered correspondence between her husband and Sarsfield. This would be known as "complemento espiritual para este". Later, Sarsfield worked on Sarmiento's candidacy for the presidency, while she was in the United States. Sarmiento died on 11 September 1888. In the following years, Sarsfield traveled through Europe, Egypt and Palestine, returning to Argentina 20 years later. She published works that were important sources the political era through which the country passed. She died on 6 December 1924 in Buenos Aires, and was buried on December 7, 1924.
