= Julio Lacarte Muró =

Uruguayan diplomat and politician

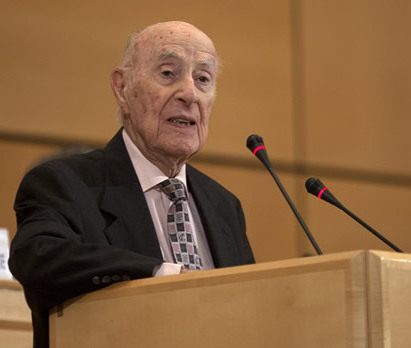
Julio Lacarte Muró in 2014

Julio Lacarte Muró (March 29, 1918 – March 4, 2016) was a Uruguayan diplomat and politician.

A man of the Colorado Party, he ran for Vice-President in 1966. In 1967 he served as Minister of Industry and Commerce in the cabinet of President Oscar Gestido. He also served in several diplomatic and commercial posts: LAFTA, GATT, WTO, UNCTAD, IBRD, OAS. He was a Member of the Appellate Body of the World Trade Organization.

Between 1967 and 1969, he served as president of the Uruguayan Football Association

== Career ==
- On September 24, 1956 he was appointed ambassador in Washington D.C.
- On February 22, 1963 he was accredited as Uruguayan Ambassador to Belgium.

Preceded by Conrado Sáez	Uruguayan Football Association; 1967–1969	Succeeded by Américo Gil
