= Civil code of Argentina =

Legal code in force between 1871 and 2015

Civil Code of Argentina

National Congress of Argentina
- Passed by: Chamber of Deputies
- Passed: 22 September 1869
- Passed by: Senate
- Passed: 29 September 1869
- Signed by: Domingo Faustino Sarmiento
- Signed: 29 September 1869
- Effective: 1 January 1871
- Repealed: 1 August 2015

Repealed by
- Civil and Commercial Code
- Status: Repealed

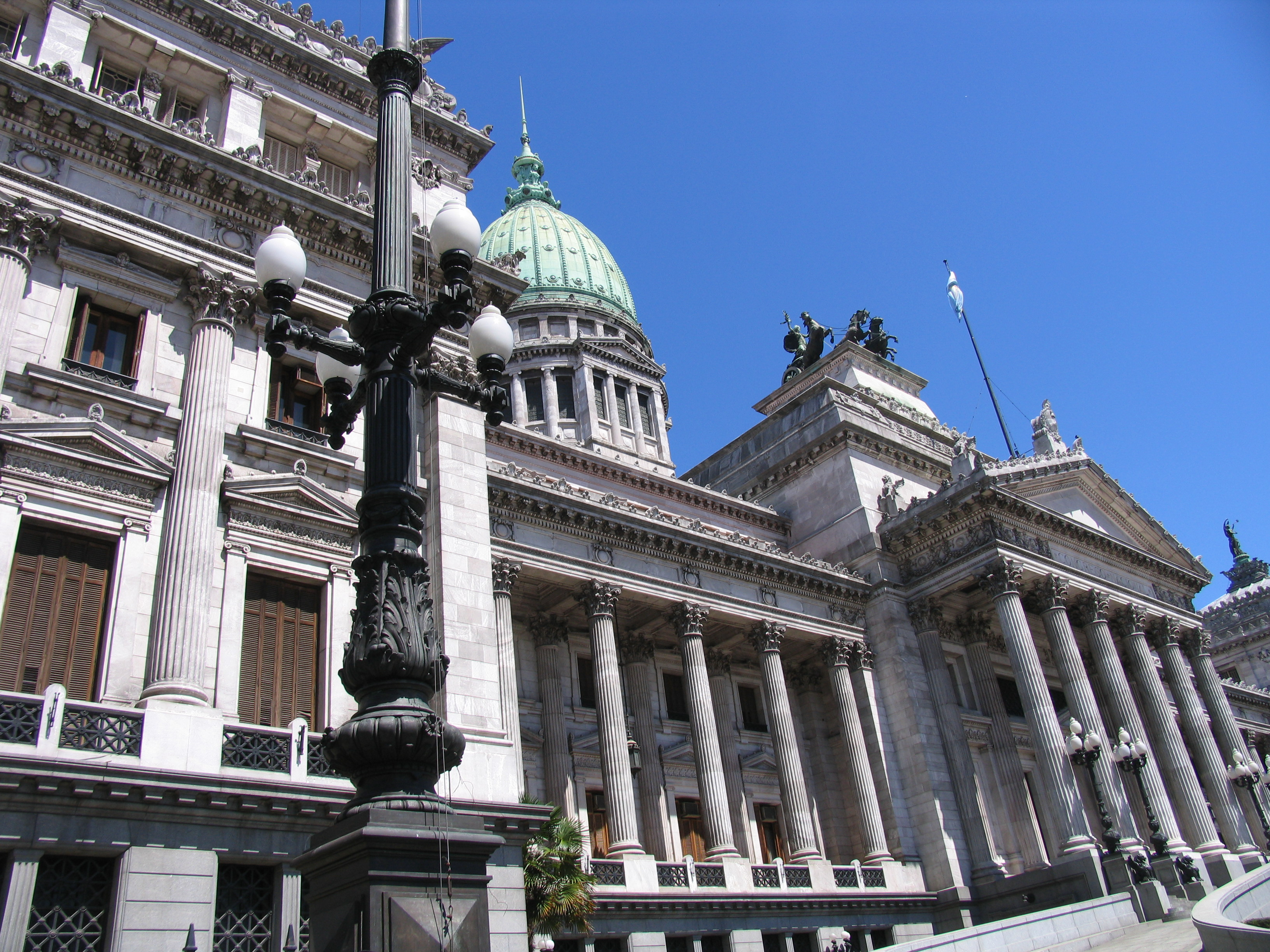
Congress building in Buenos Aires, Argentina

The Civil Code of Argentina was the legal code in force between 1871 and 2015, which formed the foundation of the system of civil law in Argentina. It was written by Dalmacio Vélez Sársfield, as the culmination of a series of attempts to codify civil law in Argentina. The original code was approved on September 25, 1869, by the passage of Law 340, and became active on January 1, 1871. With numerous subsequent modifications, it continued to be the foundation of Argentine civil law (Derecho civil argentino) for more than a century. On 1 August 2015, the Civil Code of Argentina was replaced by a new Civil and Commercial Code - Código Civil y Comercial de la Nación.

Vélez Sársfield's code reflects the influence of the continental law and liberal principles of the 17th century. It was also influenced by the great Napoleonic Code, the Spanish laws in effect at that time in Argentina, Roman law (especially through the work of Savigny), canon law, the draft of the Brazilian civil code (Esboço de um Código Civil para Brasil) by Freitas, and the influence of the Chilean Civil Code (by Andrés Bello).

Approval of the Argentine civil code was necessary for judicial reasons and political reasons. It gave a new coherence and unity to civil law. The civil code's authority over provincial law improved the inconsistent existing legislation throughout the country at the time. This unity and coherence would bring two important benefits: it would facilitate both the people's knowledge about the law, as well as its application by judges, the legislation would also strengthen the political independence of the country, through legislative independence and national unity.

In spite of the stability brought by the civil code to the Argentine law system, it was subject to various modifications throughout its history, as was necessary to adequately regulate a society undergoing significant social, political and economical changes. The most important reform was Law 17.711 of April 22, 1968. Not only did the law change around 5% of the complete article, it is especially important due to the change in orientation regarding some regulated institutions. There were also other reform projects that were not implemented. Along with proposals to change institutions and methods, one of them proposed to merge the civil code with the commercial code, following the example of the Italian code.

After decades of deliberations, a new Código Civil y Comercial de la Nación was approved in 2014, and entered into force in 2015, replacing the old code.

== Precursors ==
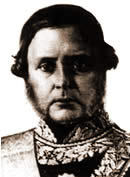
During the Justo José de Urquiza administration many projects were driven forward.

The codification in Argentina was part of a process being undertaken around the world, due to the advantages that such a systematic approach granted. Indeed, there had been earlier codifications; those completed toward the end of the 18th century and the beginning of the 19th century had a strong influence on the compilation of the Civil Code of Argentina. Stemming from these, there were separate attempts at civil codification in the Argentine republic during the first half of the 19th century, but it was finally achieved in 1869.

The unification of the country and its political growth and strengthening demanded the codification of the civil laws, since it was not possible to continue under the uncertainty caused by the inadequate code that existed under the rule of the Spanish.

Before the Civil Code, there had been several attempts to this effect, without success. In 1824, Juan Gregorio de las Heras issued a decree appointing one commission charged with compiling the Commercial Code and another charged with compiling the Military Code, but neither of these two projects' efforts came to fruition. In 1831, the Legislature of Buenos Aires adopted the Spanish Commercial Code compiled in 1829 and created a commission to see to any reforms to it that might be necessary. In 1852, Justo José de Urquiza created a commission of 14 members for the compilation of the Civil, Penal, Commercial and Procedural Codes. However, the revolution of September 11 of that year, which resulted in the secession of the Province of Buenos Aires from the Argentine Confederacy, prevented this project from making any concrete progress.

The Argentine Constitution of 1853, in clause 11 of article 67, authorized the Argentine National Congress to draw up the Civil, Commercial, Penal and Mining Codes. With the intent of fulfilling this constitutional mandate, Facundo Zuviría brought before the Senate a law that would empower the Executive Branch to appoint a commission to complete those tasks. The law was passed and signed by Urquiza, but for financial reasons the initiative was postponed.

In the State of Buenos Aires, an initiative to launch a Civil Code suffered the same fate. On October 17, 1857, a law was passed that authorized the Executive Branch to spend the necessary funds to compile the Civil, Criminal and Procedural Codes, but the initiative was ultimately frustrated. However, the Commercial Code had better luck. The task of compiling that code had been given to Dalmacio Vélez Sársfield and Eduardo Acevedo Maturana, who sent it to the legislature for its approval. The Commercial Code of the State of Buenos Aires was finally passed in 1859, and it was this code that was adopted at the national level in 1862 and amended in 1889.

=== Legislation in force prior to its sanction ===
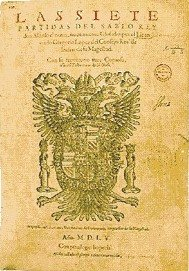
Front page of the Siete Partidas.

Until the sanction of the Code, the Argentine legislation was based on the Spanish legislation previous to the May Revolution, and on the one called Legislación Patria (Native Legislation).

The Spanish legislation in use in the country was the New Compilation of 1567, since the Newest Compilation of 1805 did not have application before the revolution. The New Compilation contained laws coming from the Fuero Real (Royal Jurisdiction), the Ordenamiento de Alcalá (the Code Law Reordering of Alcalá), the Reordering of Montalvo and the Laws of Toro. In order of importance:

- 1st New Compilation,
- 2nd Fuero Real,
- 3rd Fuero Juzgo,
- 4th Fuero viejo de Castilla (Old Fuero of Castile),
- 5th the Partidas.

Nevertheless, the Siete Partidas (Seven-Part Codes) were more often applied due to their prestige, the extension of the addressed matters, and the further knowledge of them by judges and lawyers.

The Legislación Patria was composed of the laws sanctioned by the provincial and national governments. These laws were of considerably less importance compared to the Spanish legislation and weren't altered, confirming the principle according to which the political emancipation lets endure the previous private Law until the new State arranges otherwise, in exercise of its sovereignty.

The primary national laws were the liberty of wombs (Libertad de Vientres) and of the slaves entering the territory (1813), the suppression of entailed states (mayorazgo) (1813) and of emphyteusis (1826), and the suppression of gentilic retract (1868), that gave the right to re-acquire family real estate sold to a stranger to the nearest relative of the original vendor (up to the 4th grade of kinship).

Other various laws and provincial decrees modifying different institutions existed, as the emancipation by age rating (dictated by Buenos Aires on November 17, 1824, by Tucumán on September 1, 1860, and by Entre Ríos on March 10, 1866); the determination of domicile in the main estate (dictated by Buenos Aires on September 16, 1859), about books of births, matrimonies and deaths, being the parish priests in charge (dictated by Buenos Aires on December 19, 1821, by Jujuy on September 7, 1836, and by Santa Fe on May 17, 1862); about restrictions and limits to the domains (dictated by Buenos Aires on July 27, 1865, by Jujuy in February 1855 and March 7, 1857, and by Córdoba on August 27, 1868); and of the renting of fields (dictated by Santa Fe on July 31, 1837).

== Sanction ==
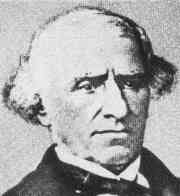
Dalmacio Vélez Sársfield, editor of the Civil Code

Argentina had been attempting without success to join the codifying movement in vogue at that time in some of the world's most powerful nations. The creation of the code would bring several advantages to the legislation that was at that time characterized by its dispersion, and consequently, its difficult implementation. The new system would provide mainly a unity and coherence to the civil legislation, and thus it would help it to be known and applied.

There were also reasons of judicial nationalism that were motives for its creation, since it was considered necessary to reaffirm the political independence obtained decades before through legislative independence. The legislation most influential on Argentine law was until then the Spanish legislation, sanctioned centuries before, primarily because national law had minimal influence on private law.

Finally, the sanction of a code was hoped to become an efficient instrument for the consolidation of the national unity that had been expensively obtained only a few years earlier. The unification could have been damaged if the provinces had kept their own laws, or had independently sanctioned new ones to fix the inadequacies in the Spanish one instead of doing it in an unified way.

On June 6, 1863, Law No. 36, sponsored by deputy José María Cabral from Corrientes Province, was passed, which empowered the executive branch to appoint commissions in charge of writing the projects for the Civil, Penal, and Mining Codes and Military Ordinances.

Even though the law allowed for the creation of commissions of several persons, president Bartolomé Mitre decided to put a single person in charge, Dalmacio Vélez Sársfield, through a decree dated October 20, 1864.

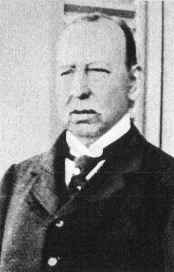
Victorino de la Plaza, president of Argentina, was one of Vélez Sársfield's assistants.

Vélez Sársfield redacted the Project for the Civil Code without collaborators other than assistants that would transcribe his drafts. Among them were Victorino de la Plaza, who later would become president, Eduardo Díaz de Vivar and Vélez Sársfield's daughter Aurelia. For the task, Vélez Sársfield withdrew to a country house he owned, located a few kilometers from Buenos Aires city, where he wrote the drafts that his assistants transcribed. The final transcript was delivered to the government for its printing, and was later destroyed. The drafts can currently be found at the Universidad Nacional de Córdoba.

As Vélez Sársfield moved forward with his work, he would send it to the executive branch, which would then print and distribute it among the legislators, magistrates, lawyers and "competent persons, to allow them to study the work now and build an opinion of it for the time of its ratification". Vélez Sársfield finished Book I in 1865, the first two sections of Book II in 1866, the third section of that book at the beginning of 1867, Book III in 1868, and Book IV in 1869, finishing the code after 4 years and 2 months of work.

The project completed, President Domingo Faustino Sarmiento sent a note to the Congress on August 25, 1869, proposing the law that would ratify the project of the Civil Code. In the message, Sarmiento recommended immediate implementation, "entrusting its reform to the passage of future laws that will be enacted as experience dictates their necessity".

The Chamber of Deputies approved the project on September 22, 1869, after rejecting various alternate version and objections to its being passed without amendment. The chamber determined that it would become effective on January 1, 1871. It then passed to the Senate, which ratified it on September 25, and it was promulgated by Sarmiento on September 29.

The Project was closed-book endorsed, that is it was accepted without changes to the original, which according to Llambías did not require any debate:

Parliamentary bodies, due to their composition and functioning, lack the capacity to undertake the study and analytical debate related to a scientific task of such a delicate systematic nature as a Code. It can only be expected that such debate will become inorganic and endless, and that in the case of the passage of proposed amendments the coherence of the general system will be ruined, through the failure to recognize that the main advantage of codifying efforts resides in the methodizing of the law, which allows the maximum usefulness to be obtained from it later.

— Llambías (2003). ps. 171 and ss.

The endorsement of the Civil Code represented a great improvement over the previous legal regime, and fused modern advances in doctrine with local customs and active law.

== Sources of the Civil Code ==
In his work on the Code, Dalmacio Vélez Sársfield was inspired by contemporary and older codes, by national and international law, and to a large extent by the prevailing doctrines of the period. These sources can be classified as follows: Roman law, Spanish and Argentine law, canon law, the Napoleonic Code and its commentaries, the work of Freitas, and various other minor sources.

=== Roman law ===
Roman law was not a direct influence on the civil code in the sense that none of its dispositions were directly extracted from the Corpus Iuris Civilis or from any Roman jurist's passage. Nevertheless, Vélez Sársfield returned to the Roman criteria in some institutions' regulations, even those that hadn't been addressed by the contemporary codification. That was the case of property transmitted by "tradition", as opposed to the French code, which had changed it to transmission by "consentment". Moreover, among the notes of the codifier there are quotes of those laws, but they are second-hand references.

The indirect Roman influence is reflected in the most part in the doctrines used by the author, especially as regards patrimonial structures. The main influence on the work of Vélez Sarsfield was the German Romanist Friedrich Carl von Savigny with his work "System of the present Roman law" (System des heutigen römischen Rechts), used especially referring to legal entities, obligations, property and possession, and the adoption of the domicile principle as a determining element of the law, applicable to the people's marital status and capacity.

=== Spanish and native legislation ===
Once he finished the gathering process, Vélez Sársfield was criticized for ignoring the Spanish legislation, which by the time was the one in effect in Argentina. One of these critics was Juan Bautista Alberdi, who was refuted by the modernizing critic and by Vélez himself:

"Had Dr. Alberdi gone at least lightly through my project, he would have found that the first source I make use of at the laws that rule us. The biggest number of articles have a note on the law of Partidas, of the Royal Forum, of the recopilated ones. "

— Cabral Texo, Jorge. "Juicios críticos sobre el Código Civil argentino", p. 249.

The influence of this legislation regarding its method and technique was practically null, what can be understood due to the dispersion that characterized it. Nevertheless, on the material, and the sense and reach of the dispositions, Vélez did make use of the old Right, adopting it to the new needs.

The national legislation had little relevance on private law, though it did partially influence on the work of the Coder. Such is the case of the hereditary vocation of the article 3,572, whose antecedent is the law dictated by the legislature of the Buenos Aires Province dictated on May 22, 1857. Vélez had also in mind the uses and customs of the country, especially regarding the family organisation.

=== Canon law ===
Canon law had a large influence over family law, especially in the area of matrimony. Vélez Sársfield left matrimony under the jurisdiction of the Catholic Church, taking the institution of canonical marriage and giving it civil effects. But the validity of matrimony was unchanged from the canonical version and the dispositions of the ecclesiastical courts, which would remain until the sanction of the law of civil matrimony. About this, Vélez Sársfield expressed:

"Catholic people, such as the people of the Argentine Republic, would not be able to contract civil matrimony. For them it would be an endless concubinage, condemned by the religion and customs of the country. Any law that would authorize such matrimonies, in the present state of our society, would ignore the mission of the laws, which is to keep and strengthen the power of customs, not to weaken and corrupt them. It would give incentive to Catholic people to ignore the precepts of their religion, without a beneficial result for individuals or families.
For those who do not profess the Catholic religion, a law that gives marriage a religious characteristic does not attack in any sense the freedom of cult, for the law doesn't force anyone to renounce their beliefs. Each one can invoke God from the altar of one's own cult." ."

— Note on article 167, Código Civil Argentino

This resolution by Vélez Sársfield is explained by the uses and customs of that time, as it shows the sanction of a law of civil matrimony by the legislature of the Santa Fe Province in 1867: the law produced a popular reaction that ended with the resignation of the governor and the dissolution of the legislature house, which annulled the law when it was reconstituted.

=== Napoleon's Code ===
The influence of this code in the Coder movement proved very important, and the Civil Code of Argentina did not escape from this influence, being in a direct way or through his commentators.

The direct influence can be shown in the 145 articles copied from the French code. But the main direct influence of the commentators is that of the treta of Charles Aubry and Frédéric Charles Rau, specially the third edition published in Paris between 1856 and 1858, of which the Coder took several passages that he used in around 700 articles. The work of Raymond Troplong provided the material for 50 articles related to the testament inheritance, and others for the real rights. From Jean Demolombe he took 52 articles for book IV and 9 for book III, from Chabot he used 18 articles for book IV, and from Zachariae 70 articles.

=== Freitas's work ===
The influence of Brazilian lawyer Augusto Teixeira de Freitas came from two of his works: the "Consolidation of the civil laws" (Consolidação das Leis Civis) and his "Draft of a civil code for Brazil" (Esboço de um Código Civil pra Brasil).

The ‘’Consolidation of the civil laws’’ sorts in 1,333 articles the material of the Portuguese legislation, that contained the same dispersion present in the Spanish legislation in use in the Americas. His "Draft" was commended to him by the Empire of Brazil in 1859, but remained unfinished after completion of article 4,908, without reaching the inheritance section. In spite of this, it was one of the most frequently consulted works by Vélez Sársfield; the first three books of the Argentine Civil Code contain more than 1,200 articles from the Draft.

=== Other sources ===
Vélez Sársfield also used a number of different Codes and doctrine works that had a secondary influence in the Argentine Civil Code.

After the Napoleonic Code, the most influential code was the Chilean Civil Code, promulgated on 1855 and written by lawman Andrés Bello. That code was highly valuated by the Argentine Coder, and it is estimated that he based on it for the formulation of 170 articles of the Argentine code.

He also made use of the Code of Louisiana, in which he based for the creation of 52 articles, of the Albertine Code for the Sardonic States, of the legislative Russian consolidation, the Code of Parma, the Code of Two Sicilies, the General Prussian Code of 1874, the Austrian Code of 1811, the Code of New York State and the Italian Code of 1865.

Vélez Sársfield made also use of the 1851 project for the Spanish Civil Code prepared by Florencio García Goyena. That project held 3,000 articles, and it's calculated that it helped in the formulation of 300 articles of the Argentine Code.

Finally, Vélez used 27 articles from the 1851 project for the Uruguayan Civil Code by Eduardo Acevedo Maturana, as well as some references for his notes.

== Structure ==
Method is of crucial importance in a codification work, due its systematic nature, and to the vastness of the subject. Hence it is important to regard and direct man's behavior through general and specific formulae that find their appropriate place among the assembled articles.

Vélez Sársfield dedicated much effort to the selection of an adequate method, and after receiving objections to the use of the methods of Justinian's Institutiones and of the French civil code, he decided to use the one followed by Freitas in his Consolidaçao das Leis Civis, which finds its origins in the teachings of Friedrich Carl von Savigny.

According to Freitas's ideas, it is convenient to commence a Code Law by the general dispositions, then address the ones referred to the subject of every legal relation ("the theory of persons"). But, as men don't live isolated but in their family's bosom, it must be continued with the Family law. Then the individual enters the civil life and establishes links person-to-person: the "obligations", or person-to-the-things submitted to him: the "real property". Finally it must be legislated about the theory of estate, with the "successions" and the "theory of privileges". To end, the institution of prescriptions, that, as referring to the rights as a whole, it was considered appropriate to locate it in a section inside the common dispositions to the real and personal rights.

Thus, the Civil Code organisation is the following:

- Preliminary titles: the Civil Code begins with two preliminary titles. The first title deals with the laws and elaborated a "general theory of the law". The second refers to the way of counting the intervals in law.
- Book I: This book is dedicated to the people. Its first section "Of the people in general", deals with the persons themselves, and the second, "On personal rights in family relationships", with the family.
- Book II: This book is divided into three sections. The first deals with the obligations in general and their limits. The second, talks about the judicial acts and doings that produced the acquisition, modification, transfer and lose of the rights and obligations. Finally, the third deals with obligations from contracts.
- Book III: This book talks about real rights, dealing with things themselves, or in relation with the persons.
- Book IV: This book contains a preliminary title about the transmission of rights in general. It then has three sections: the first about successions mortis causa, the second about privileges and right of keeping, and the third about prescription.

=== Fundamental principles ===
The compilation of the Civil Code was organized around a set of fundamental principles, which were based on ideas in vogue at the time of its compilation:

- Sovereign will principle: The terms specified in contracts should be respected as if they were law, insofar as the exercise of a right would not constitute an illicit act. However, jurisprudence has established restrictions on this principle, as specified by Article 953, in the so-called "moral clause": "The object of legal compacts should be acts that are not contrary to respected custom."
- Responsibility based on fault: Civil responsibility was grounded in the idea of fault. Article 1067 establishes that no punishable illicit act exists where there has been no harm caused, or exterior action that could cause harm, and without the ability to impute Mens rea, fault or negligence to the actor.
- Absolute right to property: The right of private property allows one to use, enjoy, and even destroy something owned, but there are certain limitations imposed on the reach of this right, and jurisprudence establishes restrictions, based on the aforementioned Article 953. The justification of the right to destroy property is established in the following note found in Article 2.513: "[...] But it must be recognized that with absolute right to property, comes the right to destroy property. Any preventive restriction would cause more harm than good. If the state acts as an arbiter of abuse, soon it will begin to act as arbiter of use, and any real notion of private property and liberty would be lost."
- Family grounded in indissoluble matrimony: Family law was grounded in the concept of indissoluble matrimony, and parentage was classified according to origin, either from within marriage or outside of wedlock. Children born out of wedlock were further classified as natural, from adultery, from incest, or sacrilegious. This framework excluded non-Catholics, who had only gained the right to marry in 1888, with the reform imposed by Law N° 2.393.

=== Notes by the Codifier ===
The Civil Code of Argentina has a unique feature, which is the inclusion of footnotes with the articles, in which Vélez Sársfield explains the origin of, and principles governing, the positions adopted, sometimes citing or inserting laws and paragraphs from a source treatise.

The presence of these notes stems from a request from the Ministry of Justice, that he annotate each article and its conformity to or divergence from laws currently in force in the country, as well as those of the major world powers.

The notes are very valuable from a doctrinal standpoint. In them the codifier states the problem, summarizes the arguments and chooses a solution, always in a succinct manner. As a result, the Code became a veritable treatise on comparative law, which proved to be quite useful, as the bibliographic material available at the end of the 19th century was not plentiful.

The footnotes contain numerous errors and even contradictions vis-à-vis the article text, as can be seen in the text of articles 2.311 and 2.312 and the footnote to the former. Some of these errors are attributable to the codifier, but others are likely due to circumstances beyond his control. There are instances where Vélez Sársfield reworked an entire title or modified a rule without altering the footnotes pertaining to the original edition. In this manner, for example, all the footnotes in Book IV were brought directly from the original drafts by Victorino de la Plaza without any of the pertinent modifications. That said, one should keep in mind that during the editing of Nueva York and La Pampa many modifications from the original text were accumulated.

== Editions ==
The project drawn up by Vélez Sársfield was printed as the author was sending the different books to the government. The first book was printed by the press called "La Nación Argentina"" (The Argentine Nation) in 1865, while the rest of the installments were printed by Pablo Cini in 1866, 1867, 1868 and 1869. During 1869 Vélez trusted Coni with the reprinting of the first book, to maintain homegenity.

This edition, known as the Buenos Aires edition, had many errors, and the numbering of the articles wasn't done with the work as a whole, but independently in every tome. This numbering method resulted very useful at the time of its writing, as the addition or suppression of new articles required minor touch-ups in the group of articles, but once printed was inefficient.

Because of this, President Sarmiento insinuated to the codifier the necessity of making a new version that included the typos corrections. Veléz Sársfield accepted this proposition, and commended this correction work to his cousin Carlos Carranza through a letter:

"...I want to ask you for the ardous service of reading with utmost care the three last books and correcting in them the printing mistakes or replacing and erasing some words that may be missing or have no need to be there. I insist that you do me this favor with all your powers so the official version be good"

— Cabral Texo (1920). p. 200

The printing was trusted by Sarmiento to the Argentine minister in Washington, D.C., Manuel García, while the rest of the task was given to the company Hallet Breen, who had quoted $2,000 less than other firms. This edition, renowned as the New York edition, maintained the numbering depending on each tome, and wasn't free of typos either.

== Laws of Errata ==
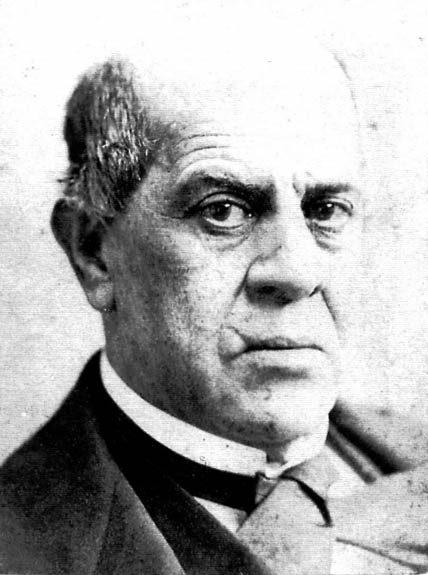
President Domingo Faustino Sarmiento pressed for the correction of mistakes in the civil code.

The first law of Errata was the law No. 527, that sanctioned what the Executive could propose for the new edition of the Civil College New York law, which could introduce a correction of 24 titles.

This was necessary because when the first copies of this edition arrived in the country at the end of 1870, President Domingo Faustino Sarmiento's opposition took advantage of the modifications in the legal code sanctioned by Congress to initiate a media campaign against the government. For this reason Victorino de la Plaza and Aurelio Prado were appointed to compare both versions and report on the existing differences. While they were doing so, on January 1, 1871, President Sarmiento's decree declared the Buenos Aires edition to be official.

In August of that year, Dr. de la Plaza and Dr. Prado reported that they had found 1,882 differences between the two texts, but due to the intrascendencia of many of these alterations, they concluded that the new edition of the code was not contrary to that sanctioned by Congress.

However, public opinion was not amiable with this solution, as it declared official a text only nominally approved by the Congress and had a great amount of misprints besides. This last problem was what the senator for Tucumán Benjamín Paz prepared to rectify, by means of a law project presented in 1878 that noticed 29 new errors. As this project passed through the commissions of the Chambers of Deputies and Senators, the number grew up as far as 285. This 285 errors are the ones that the Law No. 1196 corrects, sanctioned August 29, 1882, commonly known as the Law of Errata, though it was the second of its kind to be sanctioned.

But all the corrections were not limited to merely formal adjustments: some of them introduced changes in the doctrine of the Civil Code edited by Vélez Sársfield. This is the case of the alteration introduced in the article 325, in whom it was added as a requisite sine qua non the state of natural son to start an action of paternity after the father's death:

"The natural children have the right to be recognised by the father of mother, or to be declared as such by the judge, when the parents denied them as being their children, admitting in the paternity of maternity investigation all the proofs that are admitted to prove the facts, and that concur to demonstrate the natural paternity. Not being in the possession of this state, this right can only be exercised by the children during the lifes of the parents"

— Argentine Civil Code, article 325 before its modification by the Law No. 24.779

The Law 1,196 also established the making of a new edition that included the corrections stated in that law. Abiding that disposition, in 1883 the third edition of the Civil Code was made, known as The Pampa edition for the name of the workshop who did the printing. This edition includes an important modification, being that the articles are number as whole.

In 1900, President Julio A. Roca ordered a new edition that eliminated the articles revoked by the Civil Marriage Law and introduced the new dispositions without altering the numbering of the non-modified articles. At the end of the task, the project was sent to the national government, who in turn passed it to the Faculty of Law of the University of Buenos Aires to examine it. The Faculty designated a commission, who after the investigation determined that the project introduced reforms in the law doctrine. After asking for a competence extension, the Commission proposed this modifications in 1903, although the project was never dealt with by the Congress.

== Reforms ==
The rationalist notion that all law should be condensed and comprehensively written in a code was challenged by social, economic and political mutations which imposed a need for the text to be constantly updated. One of the issues that divide the doctrine on this subject is the question of whether it is more convenient to make partial reforms of the code or to completely substitute it with another one.

Until recent times, the Civil Code has only been partially reformed, the most notable reform effort being that associated with Law 17.711. Nevertheless, there have been several projects to replace the Code completely, including one that went so far as to attempt to merge it with the Commercial Code.

=== Partial reforms ===
The changes in these laws were made by the court system or by legislative reform, and the ones listed here are only the most influential.

- Civil marriage law: The original civil code denied non-Catholics the right to marry. On November 12, 1888, law number 2,393 provided the right of civil marriage, effective immediately.
- Women's civil right's law. On September 14, 1926, law number 11,357 provided more legal rights for married women.
- Name: The regulation of people's names was addressed as usually by the codifier, as the decrees 11,609/1943 and 410/1946 regulated this institution.
- Adoption law: The original civil code did not regulate adoption. On September 23, 1948, law number 13,252 created regulations.
- Law of horizontal property: Vélez Sársfield had forbidden the horizontal subdivision of property, which was overruled by law 13,512 made on September 30, 1948.
- Sales of real estate by installments or sales of fractioned real estate: The Law No. 14,005 regulated the sale by installments of sets of estates, in order to guide the buyers. It was later modified by the Law No. 23,266.
- Land registry and prescription: On October 3 the Law No. 14,159 was sanctioned, establishing rules about the cadastre and the acquisition of real estate by prescription.
- Law about children born inside and outside marriage: Law number 14,367, approved on October 11, 1954, partially removed distinctions between children born inside and outside marriage.
- Regime about minors and family: Law 14,394 of December 30, 1954 modifies the penal regime of the minors, the minimum age to marry, the simple absence and the decease presumption, and incorporated the family good, which cannot been executed by a debt subsequent to the constitution as such. Another special feature of this law is that in its article 31 implements for the first time in the Argentine legislation the divorce, as part of the fight between Juan Domingo Perón's government and the Catholic Church. After the Revolución Libertadora that overthrew Perón, this reform was suspended by the order in council 4070/1956, and later substituted by the law 23,515 in 1987.
- Registry of motor vehicles: The order in council 6582/1958 created the National Registry of Motor Vehicles Property and made compulsory the registry of the legal businesses which transmitted their property.
- Name of physical persons: The existent regulations about the name were replaced by Law No. 18,248, promulgated on October 28, 1968.
- Adoption: The old law was replaced by law number 19,134 on June 3, 1971.
- Foundations: Foundations had a void in the code, until Law No. 19,386, which came into effect on September 25, 1972, regulated the regime.
- Right of private life: On September 30, 1975, Law No. 21,173 was sanctioned, which included the article 1071 bis on the code regulating said right.
- Transplants: The national regime on organ transplants was determined by Law number 21,541, approved on March 18, 1977.
- Marks and brands: This regime, used for livestock identification, was incorporated to the legislation by means of Law No. 22,939 of October 6, 1983. Previously it was regulated by the rural codes.
- Law of blood: Law No. 22,990 of November 20, 1983 regulates the uses of human blood.
- Filiation and paternity authority: Law No. 23,264 of September 25, 1985 compares the children born outside marriage at the same level to those born within, and establishes that parental responsibility can be exercised by both parents.
- Civil marriage: Law No. 23,515 modifies the matrimony regime, and reestablishes the divorce, which had been suspended since 1956.
- Pact of San José, Costa Rica: Law No. 23,504 ratified the American Convention on Human Rights which sought to consolidate human rights.
- Elimination of all kind of woman discrimination: The ratification of the Convention about the Elimination of all kinds of Discrimination against Women was product of Law No. 23,179.
- Convertibility Law: The so-called Convertibility Law fixed the exchange-rate between australs and dollars, and introduced some reforms to the Civil Code's regime. This law, No. 23,928, allowed to convene that the agreed obligations in a foreign currency were to be resolved only in the stipulated currency. This reforms survived the abandoning of the convertibility regime by the Law No. 25,561.
- Law of escrow and leasing: Law No. 24,441 incorporated the contract of escrow and leasing, which meant a great advance for the Argentine legislation.

==== Law No. 17,711 ====
In 1966 the State Secretary Office of Justice designated a commission to evaluate a reform to the Civil Code, without determining whether it should be total or partial. In the beginning the commission was made up of Roberto Martínez Ruiz, José Bidau, Guillermo Borda, Abel Fleitas, José López Olaciregui, Dalmiro Alsina Atienza and Alberto Spota; although after the resignation of the last three, only the doctors Bidau, Fleitas and Martínez Ruiz formed the project. Borda occupied at that moment the position of Interior minister, but that didn't stop him from contributing to the project, as the elevation note established, giving "evidence of the valuable and effective collaboration made by the minister of Interior, the doctor Guillermo A. Borda, who dedicated long hours to the deliberations (of the Commission), in spite of the multiple tasks due to the official duties of the position he currently occupies"

Law No. 17,711 was sanctioned on April 22, 1968, and came into force on July 1 that same year. This law affects approximately 5% of the Civil Code articles (200 articles in whole), but its importance transcends numbers, as it changes some of the backbone criteria of the established regime.

Among the most important changes, this reform included the theory of abuse of rights, the lesion vice, the good faith principle as the rule for interpretation in contracts, the theory of unforeseenness, the limitation of the absolute character of the property, the generous repairing of moral damage in the contractual and extra-contractual civil responsibility, the possibility of reducing the compensation in the forced crimes, the solidarity of the co-authors of forced crimes, the automatic delay as a rule in obligations with deadlines, the implicit resolutory condition in contracts, the registry inscription as publicity for the transmission of property rights on real estate, the protection of third parties with good faith sub-acquirants of property or personal rights in case of nullity, the acquisition of age at 21, the emancipation by age abilitation, the extension of the capacity of the working minor, the personal separation by joint proposal and modification of the succession order.

Although not all the doctrine agreed then with the changes made by the law, which gave it many criticisms, time proved that the reform was an important advance in the Argentine civil legislation.

=== Integral Reform Projects ===
==== Bibiloni Draft ====
This was the first project for integral reform of the Civil Code, which took place in 1926. This project was begun by the Law No. 12,542 and then expanded by 13,156, which established a committee formed by a member designated by the Supreme Court of Argentina, another member by the National Academy of Legal Science (Academia Nacional de Ciencias Jurídicas), designated by each of the Civil Courts (Cámaras Civiles) of the Nation's Capital, another member by the Bar Association and another by the department of Right (facultades de Derecho) of the national universities of Buenos Aires, Córdoba, La Plata, and del Litoral.

The resulting committee was formed by Roberto Repetto, Julián Pera, Raymundo Salvat, Juan Bibiloni, Héctor Lafaille, Enrique Martínez Paz, Juan Carlos Rébora, José Gervasoni and Rodolfo Rivarola. This committee suffered a few changes, as Salvat resigned and was replaced by César de Tezanos Pinto, while Pera, who ascended to the position of minister of the Supreme Court, was replaced at first by Mariano de Vedia y Mitre and then by Gastón Tobal.

Doctor Bibiloni was commissioned the writing of the draft, which would serve as an orientation for debates. Bibiloni finished in six years, but while he was working different books with the same purpose were being published, similar to Dalmacio Vélez Sársfield's bill. Because of this, the committee had started to have debates since 1926 and not 1932.

This draft has a great influence in German judicial science, not only directly in the German Civil Code, but also through its commentaries. The code also used the same doctoring tool as Vélez Sársfield, the inclusion of footnotes to establish resolutions.

==== Draft of 1936 ====
The commission utilized the first draft edited by Bibiloni, but expanded it into a draft law which had great differences with Bibiloni's. Once finished with the first draft, the commission designated Lafaille and Tobal as editors, who sometimes disagreed with what was decided by the commission, and they managed to finish the draft in 1936. In spite of the changes made, the draft was signed by the editors and by Repetto, Rivarola and Martínez Paz.

As far as its methodology, the draft contained a General Section, in which it deals with people, the facts, the things, the practising of the rights and the prescription; and four books in which it deals with the family, the obligations and their sources, the real rights and the succession, and finally it features a law of registries.

The whole of the articles of the project is relatively brief; it had 2,144 articles. Each article grouped in several paragraphs the solution to the issues related with the subject that was dealt with in the article, which made them dense but facilitated their study.

After the conclusion of editing in 1936, the draft was sent to the National Executive Power on October 10 of that year. The Executive Power sent the draft to Congress, but it was never ratified.

==== 1954 Draft ====
The draft for the Civil Code was written in 1954 by the "Institute of Civil Right" (Instituto de Derecho Civil), dependent on the Ministry of Justice. Jorge Joaquín Llambías was the head of the project, with Roberto Ponssa, Jorge Mazzinghi, Jorge Bargalló Cirio and Ricardo Alberdi as collaborators.

The draft contained 1,839 articles, a very small number in comparison with the present Civil Code and other previous projects. Such synthesis was achieved by omitting the repetition of general principles, and defining only the differences to those general principles in the description of the code for particular institutions.

The used method contains a Preliminary Title, which consists of three chapters with the general resolution, norm on private international law, and the computation of time periods. Divided in five books, Book I deals with the general principles, the persons, property, facts and juridical acts; Book II with the family, Book III deals with inheritance; Book IV with the obligations and Book V regulates the real and intellectual rights.

Because of the Revolución Libertadora coup d'état, the project never reached legislative treatment, and remained inedited until 1968, when it was edited by the Universidad Nacional de Tucumán.

==== Project of legislative unification ====
Article 75 of the Argentine Constitution, at section 12, empowers the Argentine National Congress to dictate the Civil, Commercial, Penal, Mining and Work, and Social Security codes. Because of this, part of the doctrine sustained that the Constitution obstructed the legislative unification. Nevertheless, the authors argued that it is not written in which way it should be done, be it by one single body or more.

In 1986, the General Legislative Commission of the Chamber of Deputies created a committee for the "unification of the civil and commercial legislation", designing Héctor Alegría, Atilio Alterini, Jorge Alterini, Miguel Araya, Francisco de la Vega, Sergio Le Pera and Ana Piaggi as advisors, to whom would later join Horacio Fargosi.

On April 22, 1987, the project was raised, and on July 15 sanctioned by the Chamber of Deputies. The project moved on to the Senate, where a temporary commission was formed, which made several reforms, but didn't arrive to a conclusive judgement since its duration was not renovated after the originally intended six months.

At the end of 1991 the law was sanctioned with no modifications by the Senate, but later the Executive Power, considering it inadequate to the new political and economical situation, decided to veto it.

==== Código Civil y Comercial de la Nación ====
After decades of deliberations, a new code - Código Civil y Comercial de la Nación - was approved in 2014 and entered into force in 2015, replacing the old code.

== See also ==
- Civil Code of Paraguay
