= Hector Luisi =

Uruguayan politician

Héctor Luisi (September 19, 1919 – August 5, 2013) was a Uruguayan lawyer, professor, diplomat, and politician. He was the Foreign Minister (1967-1968) and the Ambassador of Uruguay to the United States (1985-1990).

Héctor Luisi was born in Montevideo on September 19, 1919. He was the son of Rear-Admiral Héctor Luisi and Berta Rodríguez-Serpa de Luisi, grandson of Ángel Luisi and Marie Thérèse Joséphine Janicki, as well as a nephew of the renowned Luisi sisters--Paulina (first Uruguayan female doctor), Clotilde (first Uruguayan female lawyer and world's first female diplomat), Luisa, Inés, Elena and Ana--pioneers of Uruguayan feminism.

He attended the Uruguayan Naval Academy, the University of the Republic’s Law School, from which he obtained a JD degree, and Cambridge University’s St. John’s College in Great Britain. There he studied international law, had amongst his professors Bertrand Russell and John Maynard Keynes, and obtained a Diploma in Comparative Legal Studies.

He was a founding partner of the law firm Nin, Luisi, & Zunino, which specialized in international civil aviation law. For decades he was a professor at the Evening High School, the Military Academy, and the “Alfredo Vázquez Acevedo Institute,” where he taught Introduction to Law.

He entered politics in the 1960s as an advisor to then National Government Councillor and later President of the Republic, Oscar Gestido. He was one of the authors of the 1966 constitutional reforms. That same year he was elected Senator for the Colorado Party. In 1967 he was appointed Foreign Minister and in 1969 Ambassador to the United States. In 1973 he resigned his post in protest against the military coup and he, together with his family, decided to live in exile. He was one of the first citizens to be proscribed by the dictatorship and one of the last to have his proscription lifted. With the return of democracy he was re-appointed Ambassador to the United States, a post in which he served until 1989 when he reached mandatory retirement age.

Ambassador Luisi was not only a legal scholar and a gifted politician, but also an enormously cultivated individual. He was fluent in several languages: English, French, Portuguese, and Italian. He was passionate about Chinese history, as well as an amateur archaeologist. Since early days he and his wife, Blanca Grosso de Luisi, travelled to many archaeological sites in different parts of the world.

He was decorated by the government of Spain as a Knight Grand Cross of the Order of Isabel la Católica, the government of Peru as a Knight Grand Cross of the Order of El Sol, the government of Chile as a Knight Grand Cross of the Order of Merit, and by Queen Elizabeth II as an Officer of the Order of the British Empire.

He was a member of the Montevideo Jockey Club and several times of its Board of Governors, as well as a member of the Golf Club of Uruguay, the Metropolitan Club of Washington, the Chevy Chase Club of Maryland, and the Metropolitan Club of New York.

He and his wife had two children, Héctor Luisi Grosso and Blanca Luisi de Ruebensaal, six grandchildren, and one great-grandson.

Luisi died at the age of 94 on August 5, 2013.
