= Chilean Civil Code =

Civil code of Chile since 1857

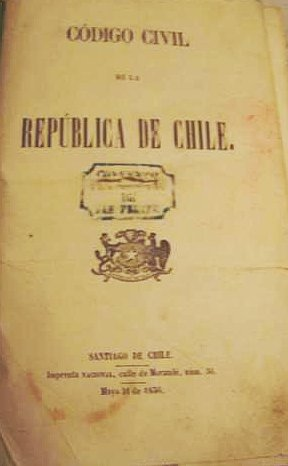
First page of the Chilean Civil Code, first edition of 1856.

The Civil Code of the Republic of Chile (Código Civil de la República de Chile, also referred to as the Code of Bello) is the work of jurist and legislator Andrés Bello. After several years of individual work (though officially presented as the work of multiple Congress commissions), Bello delivered a complete project of the Code on November 22, 1855, which was sent to Congress by President Manuel Montt, preceded by a foreword by Bello himself. Congress passed the Civil Code into law on December 14, 1855. It then came into force on January 1, 1857. Although it has been the object of numerous alterations, the Code has been kept in force since then.

== Sources ==
Traditionally, the Napoleonic Code has been considered the main source of inspiration for the Chilean Code. However, this is true only with regard to the law of obligations and the law of things (except for principle of abstraction), while it is not true at all in the matters of family and successions.

The indisputable main source of the Civil Code is the Siete Partidas (Seven-Part Code) of King Alfonso X, perhaps the pinnacle of Spanish ius commune. For instance, in relating the acquisition of property, the code makes a clear distinction between the titles and the actual acquisition of property, similarly to the Roman Law and the Austrian Allgemeines bürgerliches Gesetzbuch.

The traditional Spanish law is also manifested strongly in the matter of successions. This is true notwithstanding the important modernisations made by the Code, such as eliminating the preference for the males in the adjudication of the estate, the end of mayorazgos (the adjudication of the whole estate to the elder male son) and the adoption of a rule against successive usufructs.

Similarly, it adopted the Canonical Law provisions regarding marriage.

The Code made important changes, inspired by the examples of European Codes in place or in preparation. Regarding the real estate, the Code was inspired by the old German registry system, adapting it to the necessities of the post-colonial economy. It was the first Civil Code containing specific provisions regarding the legal persons systematically.

The Code based its method of interpretation on the Louisiana Code creating a system original to its era.

Although the Napoleonic Code influenced the Chilean Code largely regarding the law of obligations, this influence is in no case a mere transcription. For instance, while the French Code's final book is "On Contracts", the Chilean Code's last book, second title, is "On the declarations of will", comprising a general theory of contract.

The Chilean Code is of clear neoclassic inspiration. Each institution is introduced through an axiom and then the articles or sections cite examples or consequences of the axiom with a didactic purpose.

== Summary ==
- Preliminary title (articles 1 to 53): the title deals with law in general. Similar to the French Code, it establishes that laws could only be applied if they had been duly promulgated and if they had been published officially (including provisions for publishing delays, given the means of communication available at the time). Thus, no secret laws were authorized. It prohibited ex post facto laws (i.e. laws that apply to events that occurred before them). It also prohibits judges from passing general judgments of a legislative value, see above. It also defines certain concepts general to the whole civil law.
- Book I: On persons (articles 54 to 564): the book deals with the birth and death of persons, marriage and paternity. It also deals with the creation and liability of legal persons. This section of the Code has been highly modified in the last 20 years, along with the Book III, in order to eliminate discriminations between children born from married and unmarried couples.
- Book II: On goods, its property, possession, use and profit (articles 565 to 950): the book contains the general dispositions relative to the distinct kinds of goods, the means of property acquisition, possession, the rights different from property and the judicial remedies to protect them.
- Book III: On successions and donations (articles 951 to 1436): it makes provisions regarding the destination of the property after the death of a person, the formation and execution of wills and, finally, it deals with donations.
- Book IV: On obligations in general and contracts (articles 1437 to 2524): the book regulates the general theory of contracts, the most important contracts in particular, the annulment and satisfaction of contracts. It also deals with torts.
- Final article: On the obedience of the Code: the title determines the date in which the Code would come into force and the derogation of all laws relative to the matter of the Civil Code.

== Influence ==
The Chilean Code is an original work in confront with the French code both for the scheme and for the contents (similar to the Castilian law in force in that territory). This code was integrally adopted by Ecuador in 1858, El Salvador in 1859, Venezuela in 1862 (although only for that year), Nicaragua in 1867, Honduras in 1880 (until 1899 and again since 1906), Colombia in 1887 and Panama (after its separation from Colombia in 1903).

According to other Latin American experts of its time, like Augusto Teixeira de Freitas (author of the Esboço de un Código Civil para Brasil) or Dalmacio Vélez Sársfield (main author of the Argentine Civil Code), it is the most important legal accomplishment of Latin America.

== See also ==
- Civil Code
- Civil law (area)
