= Carlos Gianelli =

Uruguayan lawyer and diplomat (1948–2021)

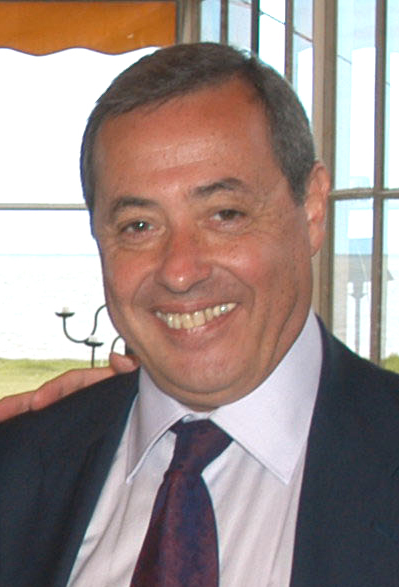
Gianelli in 2005

Carlos Alberto Gianelli Derois (March 7, 1948 – September 17, 2021) was a Uruguayan lawyer and diplomat.

Gianelli was born in Montevideo. He was Uruguayan ambassador to Saudi Arabia, Mexico, the Netherlands, and the United States of America (2005–2012), and acted for Uruguay at The Hague during the Uruguay River pulp mill dispute.

On July 23, 2015, he was reappointed Ambassador of Uruguay to the United States where he was accredited on August 3, 2015.
