= Tristán Narvaja =

Argentine and Uruguayan judge, theologian, and politician

Personal details
- Born: March 17, 1819 Córdoba, Argentina
- Died: February 19, 1877 (aged 57) Montevideo, Uruguay
- Spouse(s): Joaquina Requena Sierra (1854–1865); Umbelina Tapia y Sierra
- Children: Mercedes, Manuel Tomás, Tristán Hilario, Alfredo, Ricardo, Augusto

Tristán Narvaja (March 17, 1819 – February 19, 1877) was an Argentine and Uruguayan judge, professor, theologian, and politician.

== Biography ==
Narvaja was born on March 17, 1819, in Córdoba, Argentina, to father Pedro Narvaja Dávila and mother Mercedes Montelles. He attended school in his hometown Colegio de los Franciscanos and later in Buenos Aires, where he received his doctorate in theology and jurisprudence.

At the end of 1840 Narvaja arrived in Montevideo, renewed his title as a Doctor of Jurisprudence and was received as a lawyer. Shortly after the Sitio Grande during the Uruguayan Civil War he returned to Buenos Aires, and later traveled to Bolivia in the Argentine Andean Provinces located in Chile until the end of 1843.

Upon his return to Montevideo he practiced as a lawyer, and published legal works. In 1855 he was admitted to the Facultad de Jurisprudencia as a professor of Civil Rights, a chair that he held until 1872, the year in which the Tribunal Superior de Justicia was integrated. In 1875, he was elected the deputy for Durazno. This same year he was designated as the Minister of the Government, a position he maintained until February 1876, when the military epoch under President Lorenzo Latorre began.

Narvaja drafted the Código Civil de Uruguay, often considered a work of exemplary merit, which was put into effect in 1868. He was the author of the Código de Minería which became valid on January 17, 1876. He also contributed substantially to the correction of the Código de Comercio that had been prepared by Dr. Eduardo Acevedo Díaz. Later on, he drafted numerous works and laws, as well as being a decisive and impeller of the legislation that gave Uruguay the ability to consolidate as an independent state.

In 1854 he married Joaquina Requena Sierra, with whom he had a daughter named Mercedes. After her death in 1865, he remarried with Umbelina Tapia y Sierra with whom they had five children: Manuel Tomás, Tristán Hilario, Alfredo, Ricardo T., and Augusto.

Narvaja died on February 19, 1877, in Montevideo, after a brief illness.

He was the author of the following works, among others:

- De la Administración de Justicia en la República Oriental del Uruguay (1841)
- De la Sociedad Conyugal y las Dotes (1875)
- El Ejercicio de la Abogacía y la Defensa Libre (1875)
- Ley Hipotecaria y Graduación de Acreedores (1864, 2nd ed. 1867)
- Cuestión de oportunidad (1867).

A street in the Cordón neighborhood of Montevideo is named after him. Equally famous is the street market which bears his name, held every Sunday.
