= Eduardo Acevedo Maturana =

Uruguayan jurist and politician

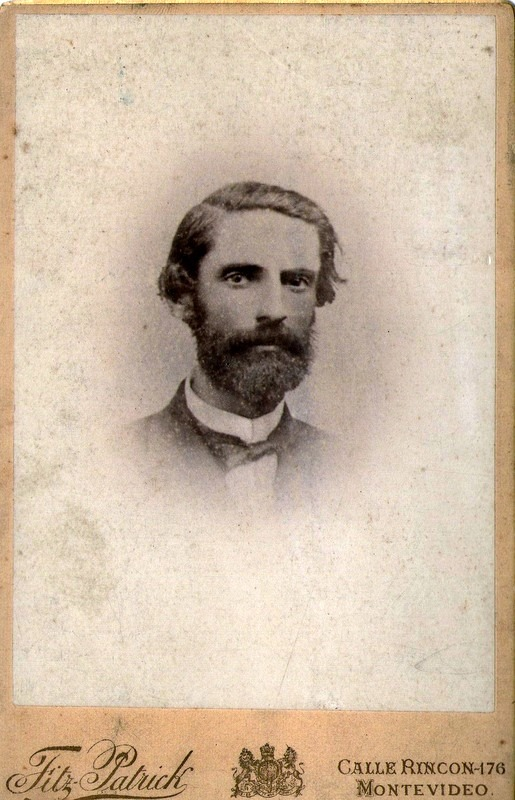
Eduardo Acevedo Maturana.

Eduardo Acevedo Maturana (Montevideo, 1815 – 1863) was a Uruguayan jurist and politician.

== Biography ==
He studied law in Buenos Aires and became a renowned law scholar. His project was influential in the later creation of the Uruguayan Civil Code by Tristán Narvaja. He also collaborated with Dalmacio Vélez Sarsfield in the elaboration of the Civil Code of Argentina.

A man from the National Party, he was Foreign Minister in the government of Bernardo Prudencio Berro in 1860. He served as the President of the Senate of Uruguay in 1863. Afterwards he was a member of the Higher Court until his death.

== Family ==
Married to Joaquina Vásquez Fernández, he had six children: Eduardo (another prominent politician), Adela, Julia, Paulina, Joaquina, and Luisa (who married Juan Carlos Blanco Fernández and gave birth to many notable lawyers and politicians).

One of his brothers, Norberto Acevedo Maturana, had also a fruitful offspring, notably the writer and journalist Eduardo Acevedo Díaz.
