= Jean Charles Florent Demolombe =

Jean Charles Florent Demolombe (1804–1887) was a French jurist who taught law at the University of Caen from 1831 on.

Demolombe is best known for his commentary of the Code Civil, in favour of whose completion he declined an appointment to the Court of Cassation. The commentary was originally planned to encompass 20 volumes. However, Demolombe could not meet his own exigent standards: even after the publication of 31 volumes from 1845 to 1882, the commentary covered only half of the Code. After Demolombe's death, the work was continued by Guillouard in much reduced form.

The monumental commentary caused Demolombe to be hailed as the greatest French jurist of his time, but his critics lambasted the work's excessive attention to detail as well as Demolombe's liberal appropriation of the ideas of others, his neglect of the Code's dogmatic structure and his overly elaborate and descriptive style. Because of these defects, the commentary came to be mostly ignored soon after Demolombe's death.

== Bibliography ==
- Motte, Olivier J. (2001). "Demolombe, Jean Charles Florent". In Michael Stolleis (ed.). Juristen: ein biographisches Lexikon; von der Antike bis zum 20. Jahrhundert (in German) (2nd ed.). München: Beck. p. 173. ISBN 3-406-45957-9.
