= Eduardo Acevedo Díaz =

Uruguayan writer, politician and journalist (1851–1921)

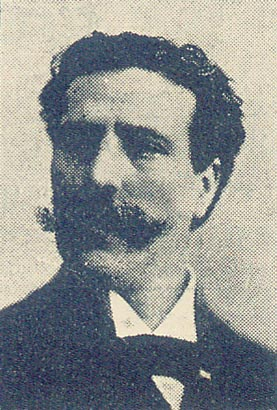
- Eduardo Acevedo Díaz, ca. 1900
- Born: 20 April 1851; Montevideo, Uruguay
- Died: 18 June 1921 (aged 70); Buenos Aires, Argentina
- Occupations: writer, political
- Relatives: Antonio F. Díaz (grandfather)

Eduardo Acevedo Díaz (20 April 1851 – 18 June 1921^{a}), was an Uruguayan writer, politician and journalist.

== Early life ==
He was born in Villa de la Unión, Montevideo, the son of Fátima Díaz and Norberto Acevedo (brother of Eduardo Acevedo Maturana, whom Acevedo Díaz named "uncle Eduardo"). His maternal grandfather was General Antonio Díaz, who was a minister of the tenure of Manuel Oribe in the Gobierno del Cerrito. Between 1866 and 1868, he earned his baccalaureate degree and in the process became friendly with Pablo de Maria and Justino Jiménez de Aréchaga in the Greater University of the Republic.

In 1868, he was associated the University Club. He entered the Faculty of Law in 1869. On 18 September 1869, he published, in the Century, his first article, a tribute to his maternal grandfather who had died six days before. In April 1870, he left University to join the revolutionary movement of Timoteo Aparicio against the Colorado government of Lorenzo Batlle.

== Politics ==
He wrote of the aim of the Revolution of Lanzas, in an article entitled "a tomb in the forest" published in the newspaper the Republic in 1872. He signed the manifesto "Profession of a Rationalist Faith" in 1872, which asserted the immortality of the soul and the existence of the Supreme God in opposition to the Pope.

The three-month Revolutionary War was concluded in July 1872, and in Montevideo, Diaz began the militarization of the National Party. He wrote for Democracy in 1873, and started the Uruguayan Magazine in 1875.

From these organs of press, Varela attacked the Pedro government, and he was sent into exile. After the failure of the Tricolor revolution against the government, he settled in Argentina, where he continued his journalistic activities living in Plata and Dolores. He returned to Uruguay, but his critics (Lorenzo Latorre) from the Democracy forced him to flee to Buenos Aires. On his return to Montevideo, he founded the National (important in the history of the Uruguayan media).

He was made a senator by the National Party and took part in the second insurrection led by the nationalist Caudillo Aparicio Saravia, in 1897. He was a member of the Council of State in 1898, but moved away politically from Saravia in later years, deciding to support José Batlle y Ordñez. This distanced him from the National Party, which he explained in a Political Letter published in the National. Batlle sent him on diplomatic missions to various countries in Europe and to America, from 1904 to 1914.

== Death and remembrance ==
He did not return to Uruguay but died in Buenos Aires, Argentina, on 18 June 1921, requesting that his remains not be repatriated to his homeland.

One of the chairs of the National Academy of Letters of Uruguay was named in his honor, in recognition of his work.

Diplomatic posts
| Preceded by Luis Alberto de Herrera | Uruguayan Minister to the United States; February 1904 – December 1906 | Succeeded by Luis Melián Lafinur |

== Works ==
- Brenda (1886)
- Ismael (1888)
- Nativa (1890)^{b}
- La boca del tigre (1890)
- La novela histórica (1890)
- Etnología indígena (1891)
- Grito de gloria (1893)
- Soledad (1894)
- Minés (1907)
- Lanza y sable (1914)

=== Stories ===
- Un sepulcro en los bosques
- El primer suplicio
- El combate de la tapera (1892)
- Desde el tronco de un ombú (1902)

=== Plays ===
- Carta política
- La civilización americana. Ensayos históricos
- La última palabra del proscrito
- Épocas militares en el Río de la Plata (1911)
- El libro del pequeño ciudadano

== See also ==
- List of Uruguayan writers
- List of Uruguayan Ambassadors to the United States § Uruguayan Ministers Plenipotentiary to the United States

== Notes ==
- Note a: Sources vary: gives a date of death of 1921 while Garzanti gives 1924
- Note b: Sources vary: Garzanti gives 1880 for Nativa while shows an 1890 edition (not necessarily the original edition)
