= Augusto Teixeira de Freitas =

Brazilian jurist (1816–1883)

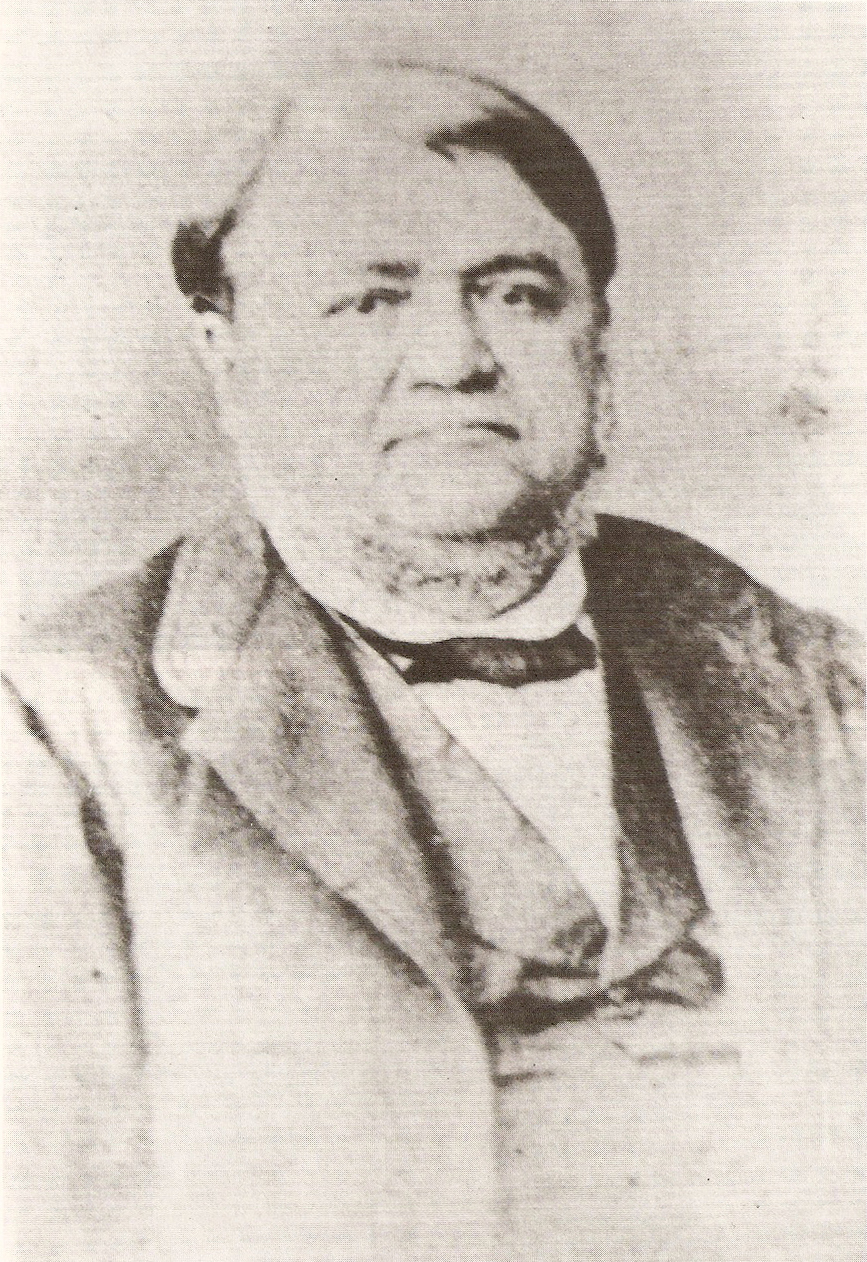
Augusto Teixeira de Freitas.

Augusto Teixeira de Freitas (1816–1883) was a prominent Brazilian jurist whose prolific writings inspired all South American private law codifications.

After studies at Olinda and São Paulo, Teixeira de Freitas practiced law as an advocate and jurisconsult. As president of the Order of Advocates and legal counsel to the State Council of the Empire of Brazil, he composed the first systematic compilation of Brazilian civil law (Consolidação das Leis Civis, 1857), which served in lieu of a civil code effectively until 1916.

His magnum opus, the Esboço de Código Civil (1860–64), a draft civil code, remained incomplete after 4,908 articles had been written, at which point the government released the exhausted jurist from his commission. The Esboço was nonetheless a pioneering work and constituted the basis of later codifications in Brazil, Argentina (by Dalmacio Velez Sarsfield) and the rest of South America.
