= Civil Code of Spain =

Civil Code
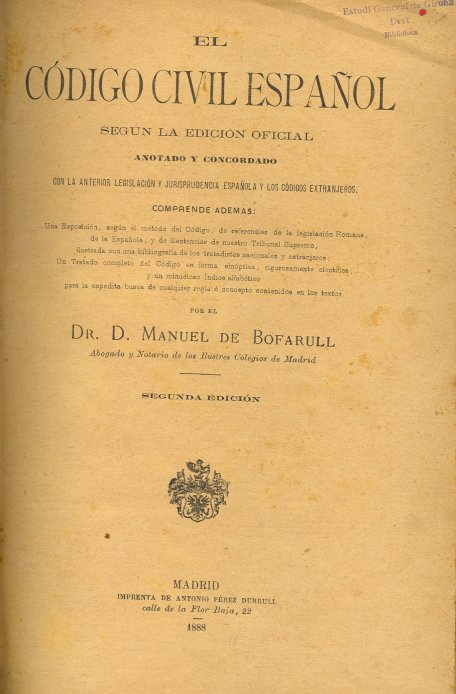
- Long title: Royal Decree of 24 July 1889
- Enacted: 24 July 1889

The Civil Code of Spain (Spanish: Código Civil), formally the Royal Decree of 24 July 1889 (Spanish: Real Decreto de 24 de julio de 1889) is the law that regulates the major aspects of Spanish civil law. It is one of the last civil codes in Continental Europe because of the sociopolitical, religious and territorial tensions that dominated 19th-century Spain. The code has been modified numerous times and remains in force.

== Structure ==
The structure of the Civil Code is heavily inspired by the French Civil Code of 1804. It is made up of 1976 articles.

- Preliminary Title. Of legal norms, their application and efficacy (articles 1 to 16).
- Book I. Of persons (articles 17 to 332).
- Book II. Of goods, of property and of their modifications (articles 333 to 608).
- Book III. Of the different ways of acquiring property (articles 609 to 1087).
- Book IV. Of obligations and contracts (articles 1088 to 1975).
- Article 1976 is a repeal provision.
- 13 transitional provisions.
- 4 additional provisions.

== Criticism ==
Like other European civil codes, the Spanish Civil Code has been subject to extensive criticism for allowing acquisitive prescription against personal property—which leaves victims of Nazi plunder with little recourse. The California State Legislature was so upset with an appellate ruling in one such case in 2024—involving deference to Spanish law over California law—that it enacted an urgency statute which expressly overrides California's governmental interest test for resolving a conflict of laws in the specific context of "art or personal property taken in cases of political persecution" and instead prescribes that California substantive law will always control in all such cases. The statute was written in such a way in order to apply this new rule not only to all new cases going forward, but also to all cases still pending on appeal, including the case which had led to its enactment.

== See also ==
- Civil law (legal system)
- Civil code
