= Dalmacio Vélez Sarsfield =

Argentine lawyer and politician

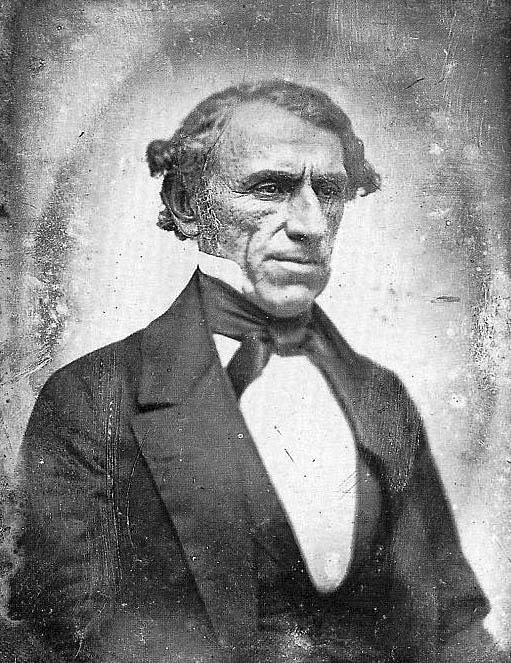
- Born: February 18, 1800; Amboy, Viceroyalty of the Río de la Plata (now in Córdoba Province, Argentina)
- Died: June 30, 1875 (aged 75); Buenos Aires
- Education: National University of Córdoba
- Relatives: Aurelia Vélez Sársfield (daughter)

Dalmacio Vélez Sarsfield (February 18, 1800 – June 30, 1875) was an Argentine lawyer and politician who wrote the Civil Code of Argentina of 1869, which remained in force until 2015, when it was replaced by the new Código Civil y Comercial de la Nación.

== Life and times ==
Vélez Sarsfield was born in Amboy, a small town in the Calamuchita Valley, in the province of Córdoba. His parents were Rosa Sarsfield Palacios (daughter of Jorge Sarsfield), whose ancestors were Irish, and Dalmacio Vélez Baigorri, who died before his son was born. He studied at the Jesuit college at the National University of Córdoba, and was particularly adept at mathematics and languages, fluently speaking English, French, Italian and Latin. He earned a juris doctor in 1822.

Upon finishing his studies, he married the former Paula Piñero, and became very active in politics. He was elected to the Chamber of Deputies, and was nominated as the Speaker of the House in 1825, a position that he took up the following year, becoming the position's youngest holder, as well as a vocal supporter of President Bernardino Rivadavia and the latter's policy in favor of centralized government. Vélez Sarsfield was awarded a professorship of Economics at the Law Faculty of the University of Buenos Aires in 1826. He represented the Buenos Aires Province Governor Juan Manuel de Rosas in a number of legal disputes with the Catholic Church, as well as with Santa Fe Province Governor Estanislao López, and was named President of the Academy of Jurisprudence in 1835.

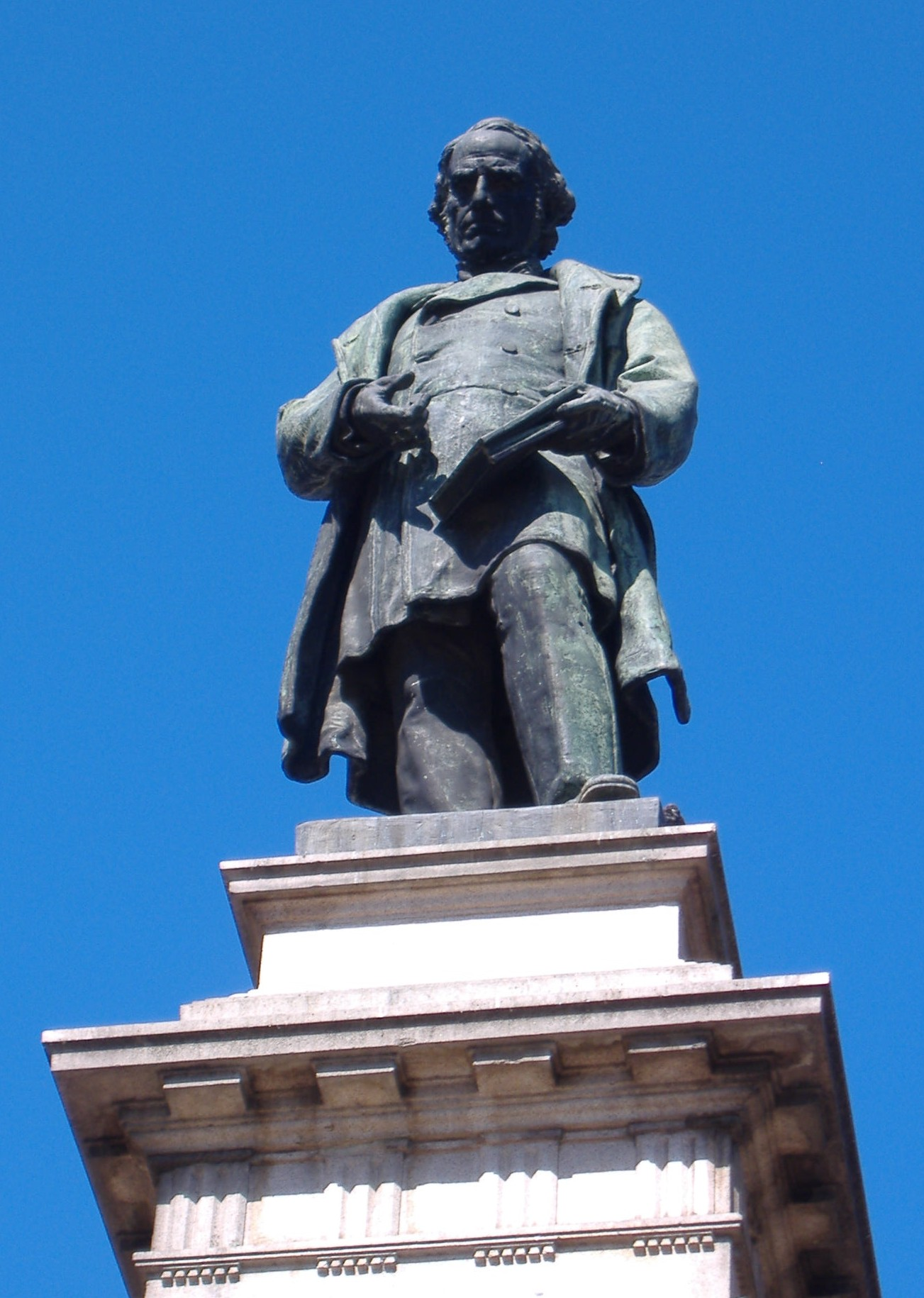
Monumental statue of Vélez Sarsfield in Córdoba.

Souring relations with Governor Rosas forced Vélez Sarsfield to leave in exile to Montevideo, Uruguay, in 1842. He befriended Unitarians José María Paz and Domingo Sarmiento (staunch opponents of Rosas), and worked with the latter in Europe before returning. He arrived to find his home destroyed by vandals and occupied by squatters; but despite their earlier dispute, Governor Rosas had the property returned to the respected lawyer.

Vélez Sarsfield allied himself with General Bartolomé Mitre, a staunch advocate of Buenos Aires interests, following Rosas' overthrow, and served as counsel to Mitre in his opposition to the San Nicolás Agreement of 1852 (which Buenos Aires rejected). Following the province's secession, Vélez Sarsfield drafted the State of Buenos Aires Constitution of 1854 for Governor Pastor Obligado. The province's defeat at the Battle of Cepeda resulted in its reunification with Argentina, towards which Vélez Sarsfield helped craft a series of requisite amendments to the Argentine Constitution.

Mitre's election to the presidency in 1862 made Vélez Sarsfield the nation's Finance Minister. He obtained congressional passage in 1863 of the Commercial Code he had earlier created for Buenos Aires, and in 1864 began work on his landmark Civil Code. He also advanced the modernization of the agrarian sector, then dominated by livestock ranching, by funding the nation's first institute of agronomy. Vélez Sarsfield was appointed Internal Affairs Minister by Mitre's successor, Domingo Sarmiento, in 1868. He encouraged immigration by having the numerous, private assistance leagues merged into the Central Immigration Commission, and on September 25, 1869, had Congress approve the Civil Code by acclamation; the document, since amended, was enacted on January 1, 1871.

The aging jurist retired afterwards, and founded El Nacional. The new periodical coincided with the launch of Mitre's La Nación, however, and El Nacional closed. Dr. Dalmacio Vélez Sarsfield died in Buenos Aires in 1875, at the age of 74; he was interred at La Recoleta Cemetery.

The barrio of Velez Sarsfield in Buenos Aires is named after him. The Vélez Sarsfield sports club, best known for its First Division football team, is indirectly named after him, having taken its name from a railway station bearing his name. The railway station is, in turn, named after Vélez‘s ancestor, the Irish patriot and exile Patrick Sarsfield, 1st Earl of Lucan. Like their Buenos Aires rivals, Boca Juniors, Vélez Sarsfield hence trace their roots to an Irish connection from an era when the Irish Argentines community, including Dalmacio, was at its zenith.

== See also ==
- Law of Argentina
- Club Atlético Vélez Sarsfield
- Vélez Sársfield (barrio)
