= Comparison of Dewey and Library of Congress subject classification =

The Dewey Decimal and Library of Congress library classification systems are the two most common systems in the United States and among the most popular world-wide. These systems organize resources like books or other media by concept and assign call numbers that are, in part used to shelve and retrieve materials. The Dewey Decimal Classification (DDC) is used predominantly in public libraries in the United States while the Library of Congress Classification (LCC) is used primarily in academic libraries.

== Characteristics ==
The Dewey Decimal Classification (DDC) was first published by Melvil Dewey in 1876, and included a detailed justification for his use of decimal notation. DDC decimal notation ID can be expanded or reduced as needed by libraries. It was designed for medium and small sized collections, including those found in public libraries, school libraries, and small academic libraries. It consists of ten numeric classes that represent broad fields of study. Using numbers, each class is divided into ten divisions or subclasses. During the cataloging process, each item is assigned a three-digit DDC number that represents class, division, and section, followed by a cutter number that identifies the author. For example, the call number 813.54 M37 includes 800 for the main class of literature, 810 for the division of American literature in English, 813 for American fiction in English, and the cutter M37 for the author.

The Library of Congress Classification (LCC) was introduced in 1900, based on the collection of the Library of Congress, the largest library in the world. LCC was adopted by other institutions with larger or specialized collections, such as those found in academic libraries and research libraries. In 2019, 81 percent of US academic libraries and 93 percent of Nigeria's academic libraries used the Library of Congress Cataloging system. LCC has 21 main classes, each designated with a letter of the alphabet, excluding I, O, W, X, and Y which are used to accommodate special needs of libraries that use the classification scheme. Its alpha-numeric call numbers include four parts: class/subclass, topic, cutter number, and publication date. For example, HV4708 .R83 2011, where HV stands for social sciences, 4708 is the topic social welfare, .R83 is the cutter number which represents the author, and 2011 is the year of publication.

Both classification systems are used to create a functional topical order of the resources on the library shelves. They vary in their notation: DDC is a numeric classification system, while LCC is an alpha-numeric system. LCC was developed specifically for the Library of Congress collection, while DDC was created as a system that could be adapted to a variety of library sizes and specialties. D. Kent Halsted noted, "Neither scheme is perfect nor will ever be." As with any classification system, both DDC and LCC include the bias of their creators; in this case, both systems were developed by white, Christian, male academic scholars in late 19th century America.

There are various factors that determine which classification system a library uses. The global library cooperative OCLC notes that "A library should base its decision on close versus broad classification on the size of its collection and the needs of its users." Usually, the size of a library's collection determines whether it selects DDC or LCC. While DDC was designed for medium-sized libraries, LCC allows libraries with larger collections to be more specific or precise with classifications. Thus, DDC is preferred by institutions with collections under 200,000, while LCC is recommended if the collection includes more than 500,000 items. In the 1960s and early 1970s, many larger academic libraries changed from Dewey Decimal Classification to Library of Congress Classification. After converting the college's library from DCC to LCC in 2021, West Coast Baptist College's director of library services Alyssa Sultanik concluded,

LCC tends to divide resources into smaller subclasses and may be more suitable for larger collections. Several factors can play a part in the success of LCC, such as the practicality of LCC for academic libraries, the ease of use in a specialized collection, and the ability to grow for expanding libraries and the ability to easily add new topics as needed. The collection size, depth of the materials, and intended use of the library collection should be considered when choosing between classification systems...Smaller collections may be more suited for DDC because of the classification's more generalized nature.

== Comparison ==
The following table compares the organization of resources by the Dewey Decimal and Library of Congress classification systems. It includes all 99 second-level (two-digit) Dewey Decimal classes (excluding 040), and all second-level (two-digit) Library of Congress classes.

Dewey Decimal	Library of Congress	Description	Ref.
000	A, AZ, QA, TA, Z4–659	Computer science, knowledge, and general works; history of scholarship and learning	
010	AI, Z1001–8999	Bibliography, indexes	
020	Z4–1000.5	Library and information sciences	
030	AE, AG, AY	General encyclopedic works, yearbooks, almanacs, dictionaries, directories	
040		Unassigned	
050	AN, AP	General serials and their indexes, periodicals, journals	
060	AM, AS, AY	General organization and museology, academies and learned societies, museums, collectors and collecting, associations, organizations	
070	AN, PN, Z278–549	News media, journalism, publishing, newspapers	
080	AC	Quotations, collections, collected works, series	
090	Z4-115	Manuscripts, rare books, history of books	
100	B	Psychology and philosophy, philosophy history	
110	B, BD, BH	Philosophy history, metaphysics, speculative philosophy, aesthetics	
120	BD143–237	Epistemology, speculative philosophy	
130	BF1001–1999	Parapsychology, occult sciences, astrology	
140	B, BD	Philosophical schools of thought, speculative philosophy, philosophy history	
150	BF1–940	Psychology	
160	BC	Logic	
170	BJ	Ethics	
180	B, BL, BQ	Ancient philosophy, medieval philosophy, Eastern philosophy, religions, mythology, rationalism, Buddhism, philosophy history	
190	B	Modern Western philosophy, philosophy history	
200	BL	Religion, mythology	
210	B, BL	Philosophy of religion, theory of religion, philosophy history, religions, mythology	
220	BS	The Bible	
230	BR	Christianity and Christian theology	
240	BR, BT	Christian practice and observance, doctrinal theology	
250	BR, BT	Christian pastoral practice and religious orders	
260	BR, BT	Church organization, social work, worship	
270	BR, BT	Christian church history	
280	BR, BX	Christian denominations, religions	
290	BL, BM, BP, BQ	Other religions, Judaism, Islam, Buddhism, Theosophy, Baháʼísm	
300	H, HM, HN, HQ, HS, HT	Social sciences, sociology, anthropology, human ecology, anthropogeography	
310	HA	Statistics	
320	HX, J, JA, JC, JF, JK, JL, JN, JQ, JS, JV, JX	Political science, socialism, communism, anarchism, political theory, theory of the state, Constitutional history, local government, colonies and colonization, emigration and immigration, international law, international relations	
330	HB, HC, HD, HE, HF, HG, HJ	Economics, economics theory, economics history, transportation, communication, commerce, finance, public finance, environmental sciences	
340	JX, K, KD, KE, KF, KG, KH, KJ	Law, international law, law of the United Kingdom, law of Ireland, law of Canada, law of the United States, law of Latin America, law of South America, law of Europe	
350	JF, JS, U, V	Public administration and military science, constitutional history, local government, naval science	
360	HN, HV	Social problems, social services, social history, social reforms, social pathology, criminology	
370	L	Education	
380	HE, HF	Commerce, communications, and transport	
390	BJ, CE, GR, GT	Customs, etiquette, folklore, calendar, manners	
400	P, AG	Language, philology, linguistics, dictionaries	
410	P	Linguistics, philology	
420	PE	English language, Old English languages, English philology	
430	PD, PF	Germanic languages, Germanic philology, West Germanic language, West Germanic philology	
440	PC	French language, Romance philology	
450	PC	Italian language, Romanian language, Rhaeto–Romanic language, Romance philology, Romance languages	
460	PC	Spanish language, Portuguese language	
470	PA, PC	Latin language, Italic languages, classical philology, classical literature; modern Greek literature, Byzantine literature, medieval Latin literature, modern Latin literature, Romance philology	
480	PA	Classical Greek language, modern Greek language, classical philology, classical literature, Byzantine literature, modern Greek literature, medieval Latin literature, modern Latin literature	
490	PB, PG, PH, PJ, PK, PL, PM	Other Languages: Celtic language, Celtic literature, Slavic languages, Slavic literature, Baltic languages and literature, Albanian language, Albanian literature, Finno-Ugarian languages and literature, Basque language, Basque literature, Egyptian language and philogy, Coptic language and philogy, Hamitic language and philogy, Semitic languages, Semitic philology, Indo-Iranian languages, Indo-Iranian literature, Eastern Asian languages, Eastern Asian literature, Oceanian languages, Oceanian literature, African languages, African literatures, American Indian languages, artificial languages	
500	Q	Science	
510	QA	Mathematics, computer science	
520	QB	Astronomy	
530	QC	Physics	
540	QD	Chemistry, crystallography	
550	QE, GC	Earth sciences, geology, oceanography	
560	GF, GN, QE, QH	Fossils, prehistoric life, human ecology, anthropogeography, anthropology, geology, natural history, biology	
570	QH, QP, QR	Life sciences, biology, natural history, microbiology	
580	QK	Botany	
590	QL	Animals, zoology	
600	T	Technology (applied sciences)	
610	QM, R, RA, RB, RC, RD, RE, RF, RG, RJ, RK, RL, RM, RS, RT, RV, RX, RZ	Medicine, human anatomy, public health, pathology, internal medicine, surgery, ophthalmology, otorhinolaryngology, gynecology, obstetrics, pediatrics, dentistry, dermatology, therapeutics, pharmacology, pharmacy, nursing, Thomsonian medicine, eclectic medicine, homeopathy, other systems of medicine	
620	TA, TC, TD, TE, TF, TG, TJ, TK, TL, TN, TR	Engineering, hydraulic engineering, environmental engineering, sanitary engineering, highway engineering, roads and pavement, railroads, railway engineering, mechanical engineering, electrical engineering, nuclear engineering, motor vehicles, aeronautics, astronautics, mining engineering, metallurgy, photography	
630	S, SB, SD, SF, SH, SK	Agriculture, plant industry, animal industry, plant culture, forestry, animal culture, aquaculture, fisheries, angling, hunting	
640	TT, TX	Home management, family management, home economics, handicrafts, arts and crafts	
650	H, HA, HB, HC, HD, HF, HG, HM	Management, public relations, social sciences, statistics, economic theory, demography, economic history, commerce, finance, public finance	
660	TP	Chemical engineering	
670	TS	Manufacturing	
680	TS, TT	Manufacturing specific products, graphic arts	
690	TH	Building and construction	
700	N, NX	Arts, visual arts	
710	SB	Landscaping, area planning, plant culture	
720	NA	Architecture	
730	NB, CJ	Sculpture, ceramics, metalwork, numismatics	
740	NC, NK	Drawing, decorative arts, design, illustration, applied arts, decoration, ornament	
750	ND	Painting, drawing, design, illustration, painting, print media	
760	NC, ND, NE	Graphic arts, printmaking, prints	
770	TR	Photography and photographs	
780	M, ML, MT	Music, instrumental music, vocal music, literature of music, music instruction	
790	GV	Sports, games, entertainment, recreation, leisure	
800	P, PN	Literature, rhetoric, criticism, language, literary history, literary collections, theater, oratory, journalism	
810	PS, PZ	American literature in English, juvenile belles letters	
820	PR, PZ	English literature, Old English literature, juvenile belles letters	
830	PT, PZ	German literature, Germanic literature, juvenile belles letters	
840	PQ, PZ	French literature, Romance literature, juvenile belles letters	
850	PQ, PZ	Italian literature, Romanian literature, Romance literature, juvenile belles letters	
860	PQ, PZ	Spanish literature, Portuguese literature, Romance literature, juvenile belles letters	
870	PQ, PZ	Latin literature, Italian literature, Classical philology, Classical literature, Byzantine literature, medieval Latin literature, modern Latin literature, juvenile belles letters	
880	PA, PZ	Classical Greek literature, modern Greek literature, classical philology and literature, juvenile belles letters	
890	PB, PG, PH, PJ, PK, PL, PZ	Other languages, Celtic languages, Celtic literature, Slavic languages, Slavic literature, Baltic languages and literature, Albanian languages, Albanian literature, Finno-Ugarian languages and literature, Basque language, Basque literature, Egyptian language and philology, Coptic language and philology, Hamitic languages and philology, Semitic languages, Semitic philology, Indo-Iranian languages, Indo-Iranian literature, Eastern Asian languages, East Asinan literature, Oceanic languages, Oceanian literature, African languages, African literature, juvenile belles letters	
900	CB, D, E, F	History, history of civilization, topography, history of the United States, local history of the United States, history of North America except the U.S., history of South America	
910	G, GA, GB	Geography, travel, mathematical geography, cartography, physical geography	
920	CD, CR, CS, CT	Biography, genealogy, diplomatics, archives, seals, heraldry	
930	CB, CC, CN, DA, DAW, DB, DC, DD, DE, DF, DG	History of ancient world (to ca. 499 A.D.), history of civilization, archaeology, epigraphy, inscriptions, classical antiquity, Great Britain, Central Europe, Austria, Lichtenstein, Hungary, Czechoslovakia, France, Andorra, Monaco, Germany, East Germany, Mediterranean, Greece, Italy, Malta	
940	DA, DAW, DB, DC, DD, DF, DG, DH, DJ, DJK, DK, DL, DP, DQ, DR	History of Europe (ca 500 A.D.), Great Britain, Central Europe, Austria, Liechtenstein, Hungary, Czechoslovakia, France, Andorra, Monaco, Germany, East Germany, Greece, Italy, Malta, Belgium, Luxembourg, Holland, Eastern Europe, Soviet Union, Poland, Scandinavia, Spain, Portugal, Switzerland, Balkan peninsula	
950	DS	History of Asia, China, Japan, Arabian Peninsula, Saudi Arabia, India, Iran (Persia)	
960	DT	History of Africa, Libya, Tunisia, Egypt, Sudan, Ethiopia (Abyssinia), Eritrea, Algeria, West Africa, Central Africa, South Africa	
970	E, F1–1392	History of North America, United States, Canada, Mexico	
980	F1401–3799	History of South America, Central America, Brazil, Argentina, Chile, Bolivia, Peru, Venezuela	
990	DU	History of other regions, Oceania, Australia, New Zealand, Melanesia, New Guinea	

== See also ==
- Classification
- Decimal classification
- Library catalog
- Library of Congress Subject Headings
- List of Dewey Decimal classes
