= List of Dewey Decimal classes =

Codes of a library classification system

The Dewey Decimal Classification (DDC) is structured around ten main classes covering the entire world of knowledge; each main class is further structured into ten hierarchical divisions, each having ten divisions of increasing specificity. As a system of library classification, the DDC is "arranged by discipline, not subject", so a topic like clothing is classed based on its disciplinary treatment (psychological influence of clothing at 155.95, customs associated with clothing at 391, and fashion design of clothing at 746.92) within the conceptual framework. The following list presents the ten main classes, hundred divisions, and thousand sections.

== Class 000 – Computer science, information, and general works ==
- 000 Computer science, knowledge, and systems
  - 000 Computer science, information and general works
  - 001 Knowledge
  - 002 The book (writing, libraries, and book-related topics)
  - 003 Systems
  - 004 Data processing and computer science
  - 005 Computer programming, programs, and data
  - 006 Special computer methods (e.g. AI, multimedia, VR)
  - 007–009 [Unassigned]
- 010 Bibliographies
  - 010 Bibliography
  - 011 Bibliographies
  - 012 Bibliographies of individuals
  - 013 [Unassigned]
  - 014 Bibliographies of anonymous and pseudonymous works
  - 015 Bibliographies of works from specific places
  - 016 Bibliographies of works on specific subjects
  - 017 General subject catalogs
  - 018 Catalogs arranged by author, date, etc. [moved to 017]
  - 019 Dictionary catalogs [moved to 017]
- 020 Library and information sciences
  - 020 Library and information sciences
  - 021 Library relationships (with archives, information centers, etc.)
  - 022 Administration of physical plant
  - 023 Personnel management
  - 024 [Unassigned]
  - 025 Library operations
  - 026 Libraries for specific subjects
  - 027 General libraries
  - 028 Reading and use of other information media
  - 029 [Unassigned]
- 030 Encyclopedias and books of facts
  - 030 General encyclopedic works
  - 031 Encyclopedias in American English
  - 032 Encyclopedias in English
  - 033 Encyclopedias in other Germanic languages
  - 034 Encyclopedias in French, Occitan, and Catalan
  - 035 Encyclopedias in Italian, Romanian, and related languages
  - 036 Encyclopedias in Spanish and Portuguese
  - 037 Encyclopedias in Slavic languages
  - 038 Encyclopedias in Scandinavian languages
  - 039 Encyclopedias in other languages
- 040 Unassigned — formerly Biographies
- 050 Magazines, journals and serials
  - 050 General serial publications
  - 051 Serials in American English
  - 052 Serials in English
  - 053 Serials in other Germanic languages
  - 054 Serials in French, Occitan, and Catalan
  - 055 Serials in Italian, Romanian, and related languages
  - 056 Serials in Spanish and Portuguese
  - 057 Serials in Slavic languages
  - 058 Serials in Scandinavian languages
  - 059 Serials in other languages
- 060 Associations, organizations and museums
  - 060 General organizations and museum science
  - 061 Organizations in North America
  - 062 Organizations in British Isles; in England
  - 063 Organizations in central Europe; in Germany
  - 064 Organizations in France and Monaco
  - 065 Organizations in Italy and adjacent islands
  - 066 Organizations in Iberian Peninsula and adjacent islands
  - 067 Organizations in eastern Europe; in Russia
  - 068 Organizations in other geographic areas
  - 069 Museum science
- 070 News media, journalism, and publishing
  - 070 News media, journalism, and publishing
  - 071 Newspapers in North America
  - 072 Newspapers in British Isles; in England
  - 073 Newspapers in central Europe; in Germany
  - 074 Newspapers in France and Monaco
  - 075 Newspapers in Italy and adjacent islands
  - 076 Newspapers in Iberian peninsula and adjacent islands
  - 077 Newspapers in eastern Europe; in Russia
  - 078 Newspapers in Scandinavia
  - 079 Newspapers in other geographic areas
- 080 Quotations
  - 080 General collections
  - 081 Collections in American English
  - 082 Collections in English
  - 083 Collections in other Germanic languages
  - 084 Collections in French, Occitan, Catalan
  - 085 Collections in Italian, Romanian, and related languages
  - 086 Collections in Spanish and Portuguese
  - 087 Collections in Slavic languages
  - 088 Collections in Scandinavian languages
  - 089 Collections in other languages
- 090 Manuscripts and rare books
  - 090 Manuscripts and rare books
  - 091 Manuscripts
  - 092 Block books
  - 093 Incunabula
  - 094 Printed books
  - 095 Books notable for bindings
  - 096 Books notable for illustrations
  - 097 Books notable for ownership or origin
  - 098 Prohibited works, forgeries, and hoaxes
  - 099 Books notable for format

== Class 100 – Philosophy and psychology ==
- 100 Philosophy
  - 100 Philosophy and psychology
  - 101 Theory of philosophy
  - 102 Miscellany
  - 103 Dictionaries and encyclopedias
  - 104 No longer used — formerly Essays
  - 105 Serial publications
  - 106 Organizations and management
  - 107 Education, research, related topics of philosophy
  - 108 Groups of people
  - 109 History and collected biography
- 110 Metaphysics
  - 110 Metaphysics
  - 111 Ontology
  - 112 No longer used — formerly Methodology
  - 113 Cosmology (Philosophy of nature)
  - 114 Space
  - 115 Time
  - 116 Change
  - 117 Structure
  - 118 Force and energy
  - 119 Number and quantity
- 120 Epistemology
  - 120 Epistemology, causation, and humankind
  - 121 Epistemology (theory of knowledge)
  - 122 Causation
  - 123 Determinism and indeterminism
  - 124 Teleology
  - 125 No longer used — formerly Infinity
  - 126 The self
  - 127 The unconscious and the subconscious
  - 128 Humankind
  - 129 Origin and destiny of individual souls
- 130 Parapsychology and occultism
  - 130 Parapsychology and occultism
  - 131 Parapsychological and occult methods for achieving well-being, happiness, success
  - 132 No longer used — formerly Mental derangements
  - 133 Specific topics in parapsychology and occultism
  - 134 No longer used — formerly Mesmerism and clairvoyance
  - 135 Dreams and mysteries
  - 136 No longer used — formerly Mental characteristics
  - 137 Divinatory graphology
  - 138 Physiognomy
  - 139 Phrenology
- 140 Philosophical schools of thought
  - 140 Specific philosophical schools and viewpoints
  - 141 Idealism and related systems and doctrines
  - 142 Critical philosophy
  - 143 Bergsonism and intuitionism
  - 144 Humanism and related systems and doctrines
  - 145 Sensationalism
  - 146 Naturalism and related systems and doctrines
  - 147 Pantheism and related systems and doctrines
  - 148 Dogmatism, eclecticism, liberalism, syncretism, and traditionalism
  - 149 Other philosophical systems and doctrines
- 150 Psychology
  - 150 Psychology
  - 151 No longer used — formerly Intellect
  - 152 Sensory perception, movement, emotions, and physiological drives
  - 153 Conscious mental processes and intelligence
  - 154 Subconscious and altered states and processes
  - 155 Differential and developmental psychology
  - 156 Comparative psychology
  - 157 No longer used — formerly Emotions
  - 158 Applied psychology
  - 159 No longer used — formerly Will
- 160 Philosophical logic
  - 160 Philosophical logic
  - 161 Induction
  - 162 Deduction
  - 163–164 Not assigned or no longer used
  - 165 Fallacies and sources of error
  - 166 Syllogisms
  - 167 Hypotheses
  - 168 Argument and persuasion
  - 169 Analogy
- 170 Ethics
  - 170 Ethics (moral philosophy)
  - 171 Ethical systems
  - 172 Political ethics
  - 173 Ethics of family relationships
  - 174 Occupational ethics
  - 175 Ethics of recreation, leisure, public performances, communication
  - 176 Ethics of sex and reproduction
  - 177 Ethics of social relations
  - 178 Ethics of consumption
  - 179 Other ethical norms
- 180 Ancient, medieval, and Eastern philosophy
  - 180 Ancient, medieval, Eastern philosophy
  - 181 Eastern philosophy
  - 182 Pre-Socratic Greek philosophies
  - 183 Sophistic, Socratic, related Greek philosophies
  - 184 Platonic philosophy
  - 185 Aristotelian philosophy
  - 186 Skeptic and Neoplatonic philosophies
  - 187 Epicurean philosophy
  - 188 Stoic philosophy
  - 189 Medieval Western philosophy
- 190 Modern Western philosophy (19th-century, 20th-century)
  - 190 Modern Western and other non-eastern philosophy
  - 191 Philosophy of the United States and Canada
  - 192 Philosophy of the British Isles
  - 193 Philosophy of Germany and Austria
  - 194 Philosophy of France
  - 195 Philosophy of Italy
  - 196 Philosophy of Spain and Portugal
  - 197 Philosophy of Russia
  - 198 Philosophy of Scandinavia and Finland
  - 199 Philosophy in other geographic areas

== Class 200 – Religion ==
- 200 Religion
  - 200 Religion
  - 201 Religious mythology, general classes of religion, interreligious relations and attitudes, social theology
  - 202 Doctrines
  - 203 Public worship and other practices
  - 204 Religious experience, life, practice
  - 205 Religious ethics
  - 206 Leaders and organization
  - 207 Missions and religious education
  - 208 Sources
  - 209 Sects and reform movements
- 210 Philosophy and theory of religion
  - 210 Philosophy and theory of religion
  - 211 Concepts of God
  - 212 Existence, ways of knowing God, attributes of God
  - 213 Creation
  - 214 Theodicy
  - 215 Science and religion
  - 216 No longer used—formerly Evil
  - 217 No longer used—formerly Prayer
  - 218 Humankind
  - 219 No longer used—formerly Analogies
- 220 The Bible
  - 220 Bible
  - 221 Old Testament (Tanakh)
  - 222 Historical books of Old Testament
  - 223 Poetic books of Old Testament
  - 224 Prophetic books of Old Testament
  - 225 New Testament
  - 226 Gospels and Acts
  - 227 Epistles
  - 228 Revelation (Apocalypse)
  - 229 Apocrypha, pseudepigrapha, and inter-testamental works
- 230 Christianity
  - 230 Christianity
  - 231 God
  - 232 Jesus Christ and his family
  - 233 Humankind
  - 234 Salvation and grace
  - 235 Spiritual beings
  - 236 Eschatology
  - 237 No longer used—formerly Future state
  - 238 Creeds, confessions of faith, covenants, and catechisms
  - 239 Apologetics and polemics
- 240 Christian practice and observance
  - 240 Christian moral and devotional theology
  - 241 Christian ethics
  - 242 Devotional literature
  - 243 Evangelistic writings for individuals and families
  - 244 No longer used—formerly Religious fiction
  - 245 No longer used—formerly Hymnology
  - 246 Use of art in Christianity
  - 247 Church furnishings and related articles
  - 248 Christian experience, practice, life
  - 249 Christian observances in family life
- 250 Christian orders and local church
  - 250 Local Christian church and Christian religious orders
  - 251 Preaching (Homiletics)
  - 252 Texts of sermons
  - 253 Pastoral office and work (Pastoral theology)
  - 254 Parish administration
  - 255 Religious congregations and orders
  - 256 No longer used — formerly Religious societies
  - 257 No longer used — formerly Parochial schools, libraries, etc.
  - 258 No longer used — formerly Parochial medicine
  - 259 Pastoral care of families, of specific groups of people
- 260 Social and ecclesiastical theology
  - 260 Christian social and ecclesiastical theology
  - 261 Social theology and interreligious relations and attitudes
  - 262 Ecclesiology
  - 263 Days, times, places of religious observance
  - 264 Public worship
  - 265 Sacraments, other rites and acts
  - 266 Missions
  - 267 Associations for religious work
  - 268 Religious education
  - 269 Spiritual renewal
- 270 History of Christianity
  - 270 History, geographic treatment, biography of Christianity
  - 271 Religious congregations and orders in church history
  - 272 Persecutions in church history
  - 273 Doctrinal controversies and heresies in general church history
  - 274 Christianity in Europe
  - 275 Christianity in Asia
  - 276 Christianity in Africa
  - 277 Christianity in North America
  - 278 Christianity in South America
  - 279 History of Christianity in other areas
- 280 Christian denominations
  - 280 Denominations and sects of Christian church
  - 281 Early church and Eastern churches
  - 282 Roman Catholic Church
  - 283 Anglican churches
  - 284 Protestant denominations of continental origin (Lutheran, Continental Reformed)
  - 285 Presbyterian churches, Reformed churches centered in America, Congregational churches
  - 286 Baptist, Restoration Movement, Adventist churches
  - 287 Methodist churches; churches related to Methodism
  - 288 No longer used — formerly Unitarian
  - 289 Other denominations and sects
- 290 Other religions
  - 290 Other religions
  - 291 No longer used — formerly Comparative religion
  - 292 Classical religion (Greek and Roman religion)
  - 293 Germanic religion
  - 294 Religions of Indic origin
  - 295 Zoroastrianism (Mazdaism, Parseeism)
  - 296 Judaism
  - 297 Islam, Bábism, and Baháʼí Faith
  - 298 No longer used — formerly Mormonism
  - 299 Religions not provided for elsewhere

== Class 300 – Social sciences ==
- 300 Social sciences, sociology, and anthropology
  - 300 Social sciences
  - 301 Sociology and anthropology
  - 302 Social interaction
  - 303 Social processes
  - 304 Factors affecting social behavior
  - 305 Groups of people
  - 306 Culture and institutions
  - 307 Communities
  - 308 No longer used — formerly Polygraphy
  - 309 No longer used — formerly History of sociology
- 310 Statistics
  - 310 Collections of general statistics
  - 311 No longer used — formerly Theory and methods
  - 312 No longer used — formerly Population
  - 313 No longer used — formerly Special topics
  - 314 General statistics of Europe
  - 315 General statistics of Asia
  - 316 General statistics of Africa
  - 317 General statistics of North America
  - 318 General statistics of South America
  - 319 General statistics of Australasia, Pacific Ocean islands, Atlantic Ocean islands, Arctic islands, Antarctica
- 320 Political science
  - 320 Political science (politics and government)
  - 321 Systems of governments and states
  - 322 Relation of state to organized groups and their members
  - 323 Civil and political rights
  - 324 Political process
  - 325 International migration and colonization
  - 326 Slavery and emancipation
  - 327 International relations
  - 328 The legislative process
  - 329 No longer used— formerly Political parties
- 330 Economics
  - 330 Economics
  - 331 Labor economics
  - 332 Financial economics
  - 333 Economics of land and energy
  - 334 Cooperatives
  - 335 Socialism and related systems
  - 336 Public finance
  - 337 International economics
  - 338 Production
  - 339 Macroeconomics and related topics
- 340 Law
  - 340 Law
  - 341 Law of nations
  - 342 Constitutional and administrative law
  - 343 Military, defense, public property, public finance, tax, commerce (trade), industrial law
  - 344 Labor, social service, education, cultural law
  - 345 Criminal law
  - 346 Private law
  - 347 Procedure and courts
  - 348 Laws, regulations, cases
  - 349 Law of specific jurisdictions, areas, socioeconomic regions, regional intergovernmental organizations
- 350 Public administration and military science
  - 350 Public administration and military science
  - 351 Public administration
  - 352 General considerations of public administration
  - 353 Specific fields of public administration
  - 354 Public administration of economy and environment
  - 355 Military science
  - 356 Foot forces and warfare
  - 357 Mounted forces and warfare
  - 358 Air and other specialized forces and warfare; engineering and related services
  - 359 Sea forces and warfare
- 360 Social problems and social services
  - 360 Social problems and services; associations
  - 361 Social problems and services
  - 362 Social problems of and services to groups of people
  - 363 Other social problems and services
  - 364 Criminology
  - 365 Penal and related institutions
  - 366 Secret associations and societies
  - 367 General clubs
  - 368 Insurance
  - 369 Associations
- 370 Education
  - 370 Education
  - 371 Schools and their activities, special education
  - 372 Primary education (elementary education)
  - 373 Secondary education
  - 374 Adult education
  - 375 Curriculum
  - 376 No longer used — formerly Education of women
  - 377 No longer used — formerly Ethical education
  - 378 Higher education (tertiary education)
  - 379 Public policy issues in education
- 380 Commerce, communications and transportation
  - 380 Commerce, communications, transportation
  - 381 Commerce (trade)
  - 382 International commerce (foreign trade)
  - 383 Postal communication
  - 384 Communications
  - 385 Railroad transportation
  - 386 Inland waterway and ferry transportation
  - 387 Water, air, space transportation
  - 388 Transportation
  - 389 Metrology and standardization
- 390 Customs, etiquette and folklore
  - 390 Customs, etiquette, folklore
  - 391 Costume and personal appearance
  - 392 Customs of life cycle and domestic life
  - 393 Death customs
  - 394 General customs
  - 395 Etiquette (manners)
  - 396 No longer used — formerly Women's position and treatment
  - 397 No longer used — formerly Outcast studies
  - 398 Folklore
  - 399 Customs of war and diplomacy

== Class 400 – Language ==
- 400 Language
  - 400 Language
  - 401 Philosophy and theory, international languages
  - 402 Miscellany
  - 403 Dictionaries, encyclopedias, concordances
  - 404 Special topics of language
  - 405 Serial publications
  - 406 Organizations and management
  - 407 Education, research, related topics
  - 408 Groups of people
  - 409 Geographic treatment and biography
- 410 Linguistics
  - 410 Linguistics
  - 411 Writing systems of standard forms of languages
  - 412 Etymology of standard forms of languages
  - 413 Dictionaries of standard forms of languages
  - 414 Phonology and phonetics of standard forms of languages
  - 415 Grammar of standard forms of languages
  - 416 No longer used — formerly Prosody
  - 417 Dialectology and historical linguistics
  - 418 Standard usage (Prescriptive linguistics)
  - 419 Sign languages
- 420 English and Old English languages
  - 420 English and Old English (Anglo-Saxon)
  - 421 Writing system, phonology, phonetics of standard English
  - 422 Etymology of standard English
  - 423 Dictionaries of standard English
  - 424 No longer used — formerly English thesauruses
  - 425 Grammar of standard English
  - 426 No longer used — formerly English prosodies
  - 427 Historical and geographical variations, modern nongeographic variations of English
  - 428 Standard English usage (Prescriptive linguistics)
  - 429 Old English (Anglo-Saxon)
- 430 German and related languages
  - 430 German and related languages
  - 431 Writing systems, phonology, phonetics of standard German
  - 432 Etymology of standard German
  - 433 Dictionaries of standard German
  - 434 Not assigned or no longer used
  - 435 Grammar of standard German
  - 436 Not assigned or no longer used
  - 437 Historical and geographic variations, modern nongeographic variations of German
  - 438 Standard German usage (Prescriptive linguistics)
  - 439 Other Germanic languages
- 440 French and related languages
  - 440 French and related Romance languages
  - 441 Writing systems, phonology, phonetics of standard French
  - 442 Etymology of standard French
  - 443 Dictionaries of standard French
  - 444 Not assigned or no longer used
  - 445 Grammar of standard French
  - 446 Not assigned or no longer used
  - 447 Historical and geographic variations, modern nongeographic variations of French
  - 448 Standard French usage (Prescriptive linguistics)
  - 449 Occitan Catalan, Franco-Provençal
- 450 Italian, Romanian and related languages
  - 450 Italian, Dalmatian, Romanian, Rhaetian, Sardinian, Corsican
  - 451 Writing systems, phonology, phonetics of standard Italian
  - 452 Etymology of standard Italian
  - 453 Dictionaries of standard Italian
  - 454 Not assigned or no longer used
  - 455 Grammar of standard Italian
  - 456 Not assigned or no longer used
  - 457 Historical and geographic variations, modern nongeographic variations of Italian
  - 458 Standard Italian usage (Prescriptive linguistics)
  - 459 Romanian, Rhaetian, Sardinian, Corsican
- 460 Spanish, Portuguese, Galician
  - 460 Spanish, Portuguese, Galician
  - 461 Writing systems, phonology, phonetics of standard Spanish
  - 462 Etymology of standard Spanish
  - 463 Dictionaries of standard Spanish
  - 464 Not assigned or no longer used
  - 465 Grammar of standard Spanish
  - 466 Not assigned or no longer used
  - 467 Historical and geographic variations, modern nongeographic variations of Spanish
  - 468 Standard Spanish usage (Prescriptive linguistics)
  - 469 Portuguese
- 470 Latin and Italic languages
  - 470 Latin and related Italic languages
  - 471 Writing systems, phonology, phonetics of classical Latin
  - 472 Etymology of classical Latin
  - 473 Dictionaries of classical Latin
  - 474 Not assigned or no longer used
  - 475 Grammar of classical Latin
  - 476 Not assigned or no longer used
  - 477 Old, postclassical, vulgar Latin
  - 478 Classical Latin usage (Prescriptive linguistics)
  - 479 Other Italic languages
- 480 Classical and modern Greek languages
  - 480 Classical Greek and related Hellenic languages
  - 481 Writing systems, phonology, phonetics of classical Greek
  - 482 Etymology of classical Greek
  - 483 Dictionaries of classical Greek
  - 484 Not assigned or no longer used
  - 485 Grammar of classical Greek
  - 486 Not assigned or no longer used
  - 487 Preclassical and postclassical Greek
  - 488 Classical Greek usage (Prescriptive linguistics)
  - 489 Other Hellenic languages
- 490 Other languages
  - 490 Other languages
  - 491 East Indo-European and Celtic languages
  - 492 Afro-Asiatic languages
  - 493 Non-Semitic Afro-Asiatic languages
  - 494 Altaic, Uralic, Hyperborean, Dravidian languages, miscellaneous languages of South Asia
  - 495 Languages of East Asia and Southeast Asia
  - 496 African languages
  - 497 North American native languages
  - 498 South American native languages
  - 499 Non-Austronesian languages of Oceania, Austronesian languages, miscellaneous languages

== Class 500 – Science ==
- 500 Science
  - 500 Natural sciences and mathematics
  - 501 Philosophy and theory
  - 502 Miscellany
  - 503 Dictionaries, encyclopedias, concordances
  - 504 Not assigned or no longer used
  - 505 Serial publications
  - 506 Organizations and management
  - 507 Education, research, related topics
  - 508 Natural history
  - 509 History, geographic treatment, biography
- 510 Mathematics
  - 510 Mathematics
  - 511 General principles of mathematics
  - 512 Algebra
  - 513 Arithmetic
  - 514 Topology
  - 515 Analysis
  - 516 Geometry
  - 517 Not assigned or no longer used
  - 518 Numerical analysis
  - 519 Probabilities and applied mathematics
- 520 Astronomy
  - 520 Astronomy and allied sciences
  - 521 Celestial mechanics
  - 522 Techniques, procedures, apparatus, equipment, materials
  - 523 Specific celestial bodies and phenomena
  - 524 Not assigned or no longer used
  - 525 Earth (Astronomical geography)
  - 526 Mathematical geography
  - 527 Celestial navigation
  - 528 Ephemerides
  - 529 Chronology
- 530 Physics
  - 530 Physics
  - 531 Classical mechanics
  - 532 Fluid mechanics
  - 533 Pneumatics (Gas mechanics)
  - 534 Sound and related vibrations
  - 535 Light and related radiation
  - 536 Heat
  - 537 Electricity and electronics
  - 538 Magnetism
  - 539 Modern physics
- 540 Chemistry
  - 540 Chemistry and allied sciences
  - 541 Physical chemistry
  - 542 Techniques, procedures, apparatus, equipment, materials
  - 543 Analytical chemistry
  - 544 No longer used — formerly Qualitative analysis
  - 545 No longer used — formerly Quantitative analysis
  - 546 Inorganic chemistry
  - 547 Organic chemistry
  - 548 Crystallography
  - 549 Mineralogy
- 550 Earth sciences and geology
  - 550 Earth sciences
  - 551 Geology, hydrology, meteorology
  - 552 Petrology
  - 553 Economic geology
  - 554 Earth sciences of Europe
  - 555 Earth sciences of Asia
  - 556 Earth sciences of Africa
  - 557 Earth sciences of North America
  - 558 Earth sciences of South America
  - 559 Earth sciences of Australasia, Pacific Ocean islands, Atlantic Ocean islands, Arctic islands, Antarctica, extraterrestrial worlds
- 560 Fossils and prehistoric life
  - 560 Paleontology
  - 561 Paleobotany, fossil microorganisms
  - 562 Fossil invertebrates
  - 563 Miscellaneous fossil marine and seashore invertebrates
  - 564 Fossil Mollusca and Molluscoidea
  - 565 Fossil Arthropoda
  - 566 Fossil Chordata
  - 567 Fossil cold-blooded vertebrates
  - 568 Fossil Aves (birds)
  - 569 Fossil Mammalia
- 570 Biology
  - 570 Biology
  - 571 Physiology and related subjects
  - 572 Biochemistry
  - 573 Specific physiological systems in animals, regional histology and physiology in animals
  - 574 Not assigned or no longer used
  - 575 Specific parts of and physiological systems in plants
  - 576 Genetics and evolution
  - 577 Ecology
  - 578 Natural history of organisms and related subjects
  - 579 Natural history of microorganisms, fungi, algae
- 580 Plants
  - 580 Plants
  - 581 Specific topics in natural history of plants
  - 582 Plants noted for specific vegetative characteristics and flowers
  - 583 Magnoliopsida (Dicotyledones)
  - 584 Liliopsida (Monocotyledones)
  - 585 Pinophyta (Gymnosperms)
  - 586 Cryptogamia (seedless plants)
  - 587 Pteridophyta
  - 588 Bryophyta
  - 589 No longer used—formerly Forestry
- 590 Animals (Zoology)
  - 590 Animals
  - 591 Specific topics in natural history of animals
  - 592 Invertebrates
  - 593 Miscellaneous marine and seashore invertebrates
  - 594 Mollusca and Molluscoidea
  - 595 Arthropoda
  - 596 Chordata
  - 597 Cold-blooded vertebrates
  - 598 Aves (birds)
  - 599 Mammalia (mammals)

== Class 600 – Technology ==
- 600 Technology
  - 600 Technology (applied sciences)
  - 601 Philosophy and theory
  - 602 Miscellany
  - 603 Dictionaries, encyclopedias, concordances
  - 604 Technical drawing, hazardous materials technology; groups of people
  - 605 Serial publications
  - 606 Organizations
  - 607 Education, research, related topics
  - 608 Patents
  - 609 History, geographic treatment, biography
- 610 Medicine and health
  - 610 Medicine and health
  - 611 Human anatomy, cytology, histology
  - 612 Human physiology
  - 613 Personal health and safety
  - 614 Forensic medicine; incidence of injuries, wounds, disease; public preventive medicine
  - 615 Pharmacology and therapeutics
  - 616 Diseases
  - 617 Surgery, regional medicine, dentistry, ophthalmology, otology, audiology
  - 618 Gynecology, obstetrics, pediatrics, geriatrics
  - 619 No longer used—formerly Experimental medicine
- 620 Engineering
  - 620 Engineering and applied operations
  - 621 Applied physics
  - 622 Mining and related operations
  - 623 Military and nautical engineering
  - 624 Civil engineering
  - 625 Engineering of railroads, roads
  - 626 Not assigned or no longer used
  - 627 Hydraulic engineering
  - 628 Sanitary engineering
  - 629 Other branches of engineering
- 630 Agriculture
  - 630 Agriculture and related technologies
  - 631 Specific techniques; apparatus, equipment, materials
  - 632 Plant injuries, diseases, pests
  - 633 Field and plantation crops
  - 634 Orchards, fruits, forestry
  - 635 Garden crops (horticulture)
  - 636 Animal husbandry
  - 637 Processing dairy and related products
  - 638 Insect culture
  - 639 Hunting, fishing, conservation, related technologies
- 640 Home and family management
  - 640 Home and family management
  - 641 Food and drink
  - 642 Meals and table service
  - 643 Housing and household equipment
  - 644 Household utilities
  - 645 Household furnishings
  - 646 Sewing, clothing, management of personal and family life
  - 647 Management of public households (institutional housekeeping)
  - 648 Housekeeping
  - 649 Child rearing; home care of people with disabilities and illnesses
- 650 Management and public relations
  - 650 Management and auxiliary services
  - 651 Office services
  - 652 Processes of written communication
  - 653 Shorthand
  - 654–656 Not assigned or no longer used
  - 657 Accounting
  - 658 General management
  - 659 Advertising and public relations
- 660 Chemical engineering
  - 660 Chemical engineering and related technologies
  - 661 Technology of industrial chemicals
  - 662 Technology of explosives, fuels, related products
  - 663 Beverage technology
  - 664 Food technology
  - 665 Technology of industrial oils, fats, waxes, gases
  - 666 Ceramic and allied technologies
  - 667 Cleaning, color, coating, related technologies
  - 668 Technology of other organic products
  - 669 Metallurgy
- 670 Manufacturing
  - 670 Manufacturing
  - 671 Metalworking processes and primary metal products
  - 672 Iron, steel, other iron alloys
  - 673 Nonferrous metals
  - 674 Lumber processing, wood products, cork
  - 675 Leather processing and fur processing
  - 676 Pulp and paper technology
  - 677 Textiles
  - 678 Elastomers and elastomer products
  - 679 Other products of specific kinds of materials
- 680 Manufacture for specific uses
  - 680 Manufacture of products for specific uses
  - 681 Precision instruments and other devices
  - 682 Small forge work (blacksmithing)
  - 683 Hardware and household appliances
  - 684 Furnishings and home workshops
  - 685 Leather and fur goods, and related products
  - 686 Printing and related activities
  - 687 Clothing and accessories
  - 688 Other final products, and packaging technology
  - 689 Not assigned or no longer used
- 690 Construction of buildings
  - 690 Construction of buildings
  - 691 Building materials
  - 692 Auxiliary construction practices
  - 693 Construction in specific types of materials and for specific purposes
  - 694 Wood construction
  - 695 Roof covering
  - 696 Utilities
  - 697 Heating, ventilating, air-conditioning engineering
  - 698 Detail finishing
  - 699 Not assigned or no longer used

== Class 700 – Arts and recreation ==
- 700 Arts
  - 700 The arts
  - 701 Philosophy and theory of fine arts and decorative arts
  - 702 Miscellany of fine and decorative arts
  - 703 Dictionaries, encyclopedias, concordances of fine and decorative arts
  - 704 Special topics in fine and decorative arts
  - 705 Serial publications of fine and decorative arts
  - 706 Organizations and management of fine and decorative arts
  - 707 Education, research, related topics of fine and decorative arts
  - 708 Galleries, museums, private collections of fine and decorative arts
  - 709 History, geographic treatment, biography
- 710 Area planning and landscape architecture
  - 710 Area planning and landscape architecture
  - 711 Area planning (civic art)
  - 712 Landscape architecture (Landscape design)
  - 713 Landscape architecture of trafficways
  - 714 Water features in landscape architecture
  - 715 Woody plants in landscape architecture
  - 716 Herbaceous plants in landscape architecture
  - 717 Structures in landscape architecture
  - 718 Landscape design of cemeteries
  - 719 Natural landscapes
- 720 Architecture
  - 720 Architecture
  - 721 Architectural materials and structural elements
  - 722 Architecture from earliest times to c. 300
  - 723 Architecture from c. 300 to 1399
  - 724 Architecture from 1400
  - 725 Public structures
  - 726 Buildings for religious and related purposes
  - 727 Buildings for educational and research purposes
  - 728 Residential and related buildings
  - 729 Design and decoration of structures and accessories
- 730 Sculpture, ceramics and metalwork
  - 730 Sculpture and related arts
  - 731 Processes, forms, subjects of sculpture
  - 732 Sculpture from earliest times to c. 500, sculpture of non-literate peoples
  - 733 Greek, Etruscan, Roman sculpture
  - 734 Sculpture from ca 500 to 1399
  - 735 Sculpture from 1400
  - 736 Carving and carvings
  - 737 Numismatics and sigillography
  - 738 Ceramic arts
  - 739 Art metalwork
- 740 Graphic arts and decorative arts
  - 740 Graphic arts
  - 741 Drawing and drawings
  - 742 Perspective in drawing
  - 743 Drawing and drawings by subject
  - 744 Communication design and visual design (proposed)
  - 745 Decorative arts
  - 746 Textile arts
  - 747 Interior decoration
  - 748 Glass
  - 749 Furniture and accessories
- 750 Painting
  - 750 Painting and paintings
  - 751 Techniques, procedures, apparatus, equipment, materials, forms
  - 752 Color
  - 753 Symbolism, allegory, mythology, legend
  - 754 Genre paintings
  - 755 Religion
  - 756 Not assigned or no longer used
  - 757 Human figures
  - 758 Nature, architectural subjects and cityscapes, other specific subjects
  - 759 History, geographic treatment, biography
- 760 Printmaking and prints
  - 760 Printmaking and prints
  - 761 Relief processes (block printing)
  - 762 Not assigned or no longer used
  - 763 Lithographic processes (planographic processes)
  - 764 Chromolithography and serigraphy
  - 765 Metal engraving
  - 766 Mezzotinting, aquatinting, and related processes
  - 767 Etching and drypoint
  - 768 Not assigned or no longer used
  - 769 Prints
- 770 Photography, computer art, film, video
  - 770 Photography, computer art, cinematography, videography
  - 771 Techniques, procedures, apparatus, equipment, materials
  - 772 Metallic salt processes
  - 773 Pigment processes of printing
  - 774 No longer used—formerly Holography
  - 775 No longer used—formerly Digital photography
  - 776 Computer art (digital art)
  - 777 Cinematography and videography
  - 778 Specific fields and special kinds of photography
  - 779 Photographic images
- 780 Music
  - 780 Music
  - 781 General principles and musical forms
  - 782 Vocal music
  - 783 Music for single voices
  - 784 Instruments and Instrumental ensembles and their music
  - 785 Ensembles with only one instrument per part
  - 786 Keyboard, mechanical, electrophonic, percussion instruments
  - 787 Stringed instruments (chordophones)
  - 788 Wind instruments (aerophones)
  - 789 Not assigned or no longer used
- 790 Sports, games and entertainment
  - 790 Recreational arts and performing arts
  - 791 Public performances
  - 792 Stage presentations
  - 793 Indoor games and amusements
  - 794 Indoor games of skill
  - 795 Games of chance
  - 796 Athletic and outdoor sports and games
  - 797 Aquatic sports and air sports
  - 798 Equestrian sports and animal racing
  - 799 Fishing, hunting, shooting

== Class 800 – Literature ==
- 800 Literature, rhetoric and criticism
  - 800 Literature (Belles-lettres) and rhetoric
  - 801 Philosophy and theory
  - 802 Miscellany
  - 803 Dictionaries, encyclopedias, concordances
  - 804 Not assigned or no longer used
  - 805 Serial publications
  - 806 Organizations and management
  - 807 Education, research, related topics
  - 808 Rhetoric and collections of literary texts from more than two literatures
  - 809 History, description, critical appraisal of more than two literatures
- 810 American literature in English
  - 810 American literature in English
  - 811 American poetry in English
  - 812 American drama in English
  - 813 American fiction in English
  - 814 American essays in English
  - 815 American speeches in English
  - 816 American letters in English
  - 817 American humor and satire in English
  - 818 American miscellaneous writings in English
  - 819 No longer used—formerly Puzzle activities
- 820 English and Old English literatures
  - 820 English and Old English (Anglo-Saxon) literatures
  - 821 English poetry
  - 822 English drama
  - 823 English fiction
  - 824 English essays
  - 825 English speeches
  - 826 English letters
  - 827 English humor and satire
  - 828 English miscellaneous writings
  - 829 Old English (Anglo-Saxon) literature
- 830 German and related literatures
  - 830 German literature and literatures of related languages
  - 831 German poetry
  - 832 German drama
  - 833 German fiction
  - 834 German essays
  - 835 German speeches
  - 836 German letters
  - 837 German humor and satire
  - 838 German miscellaneous writings
  - 839 Other Germanic literatures
- 840 French and related literatures
  - 840 French literature and literatures of related Romance languages
  - 841 French poetry
  - 842 French drama
  - 843 French fiction
  - 844 French essays
  - 845 French speeches
  - 846 French letters
  - 847 French humor and satire
  - 848 French miscellaneous writings
  - 849 Occitan, Catalan, Franco-Provençal literatures
- 850 Italian, Romanian and related literatures
  - 850 Literatures of Italian, Dalmatian, Romanian, Rhaetian, Sardinian, Corsican languages
  - 851 Italian poetry
  - 852 Italian drama
  - 853 Italian fiction
  - 854 Italian essays
  - 855 Italian speeches
  - 856 Italian letters
  - 857 Italian humor and satire
  - 858 Italian miscellaneous writings
  - 859 Literatures of Romanian, Rhaetian, Sardinian, Corsican languages
- 860 Spanish, Portuguese, Galician literatures
  - 860 Literatures of Spanish, Portuguese, Galician languages
  - 861 Spanish poetry
  - 862 Spanish drama
  - 863 Spanish fiction
  - 864 Spanish essays
  - 865 Spanish speeches
  - 866 Spanish letters
  - 867 Spanish humor and satire
  - 868 Spanish miscellaneous writings
  - 869 Literatures of Portuguese and Galician languages
- 870 Latin and Italic literatures
  - 870 Latin literature and literatures of related Italic languages
  - 871 Latin poetry
  - 872 Latin dramatic poetry and drama
  - 873 Latin epic poetry and fiction
  - 874 Latin lyric poetry
  - 875 Latin speeches
  - 876 Latin letters
  - 877 Latin humor and satire
  - 878 Latin miscellaneous writings
  - 879 Literatures of other Italic languages
- 880 Classical and modern Greek literatures
  - 880 Classical Greek literature and literatures of related Hellenic languages
  - 881 Classical Greek poetry
  - 882 Classical Greek drama
  - 883 Classical Greek epic poetry and fiction
  - 884 Classical Greek lyric poetry
  - 885 Classical Greek speeches
  - 886 Classical Greek letters
  - 887 Classical Greek humor and satire
  - 888 Classical Greek miscellaneous writings
  - 889 Modern Greek literature
- 890 Other literatures
  - 890 Literatures of other specific languages and language families
  - 891 East Indo-European and Celtic literatures
  - 892 Afro-Asiatic literatures
  - 893 Non-Semitic Afro-Asiatic literatures
  - 894 Literatures of Altaic, Uralic, Hyperborean, Dravidian languages; literatures of miscellaneous languages of South Asia
  - 895 Literatures of East and Southeast Asia
  - 896 African literatures
  - 897 Literatures of North American native languages
  - 898 Literatures of South American native languages
  - 899 Literatures of non-Austronesian languages of Oceania, of Austronesian languages, of miscellaneous languages

== Class 900 – History and geography ==
- 900 History
  - 900 History, geography, and auxiliary disciplines
  - 901 Philosophy and theory of history
  - 902 Miscellany of history
  - 903 Dictionaries, encyclopedias, concordances of history
  - 904 Collected accounts of events
  - 905 Serial publications of history
  - 906 Organizations and management of history
  - 907 Education, research, related topics of history
  - 908 History with respect to groups of people
  - 909 World history
- 910 Geography and travel
  - 910 Geography and travel
  - 911 Historical geography
  - 912 Graphic representations of surface of Earth and of extraterrestrial worlds
  - 913 Geography of and travel in the ancient world
  - 914 Geography of and travel in Europe
  - 915 Geography of and travel in Asia
  - 916 Geography of and travel in Africa
  - 917 Geography of and travel in North America
  - 918 Geography of and travel in South America
  - 919 Geography of and travel in Australasia, Pacific Ocean islands, Atlantic Ocean islands, Arctic islands, Antarctica, and on extraterrestrial worlds
- 920 Biography and genealogy
  - 920 Biography, genealogy, insignia
  - 921–928 This range is reserved as an optional location for biographies, which are shelved alphabetically by subject's last name.
  - 929 Genealogy, names, insignia
- 930 History of ancient world (to c. 499)
  - 930 History of ancient world to c. 499
  - 931 China to 420
  - 932 Egypt to 640
  - 933 Palestine to 70
  - 934 South Asia to 647
  - 935 Mesopotamia and Iranian Plateau to 637
  - 936 Europe north and west of Italian Peninsula to c. 499
  - 937 Italy and adjacent territories to 476
  - 938 Greece to 323
  - 939 Other parts of ancient world
- 940 History of Europe
  - 940 History of Europe
  - 941 Ireland and the British Isles
  - 942 England and Wales
  - 943 Germany and neighboring central European countries
  - 944 France and Monaco
  - 945 Italy, San Marino, Vatican City, Malta
  - 946 Spain, Andorra, Gibraltar, Portugal
  - 947 Russia and neighboring east European countries
  - 948 Scandinavia
  - 949 Other parts of Europe
- 950 History of Asia
  - 950 History of Asia
  - 951 China and adjacent areas
  - 952 Japan
  - 953 Arabian Peninsula and adjacent areas
  - 954 India and neighboring south Asian countries
  - 955 Iran
  - 956 Middle East (near East)
  - 957 Siberia (Asiatic Russia)
  - 958 Central Asia
  - 959 Southeast Asia
- 960 History of Africa
  - 960 History of Africa
  - 961 Tunisia and Libya
  - 962 Egypt, Sudan, South Sudan
  - 963 Ethiopia and Eritrea
  - 964 Morocco, Ceuta, Melilla, Western Sahara, Canary Islands
  - 965 Algeria
  - 966 West Africa and offshore islands
  - 967 Central Africa and offshore islands
  - 968 South Africa and southern Africa
  - 969 South Indian Ocean islands
- 970 History of North America
  - 970 History of North America
  - 971 Canada
  - 972 Mexico, Central America, West Indies, Bermuda
  - 973 United States
  - 974 Northeastern United States (New England and Middle Atlantic states)
  - 975 Southeastern United States (South Atlantic states)
  - 976 South central United States
  - 977 North central United States
  - 978 Western United States
  - 979 Great Basin and Pacific Slope region of United States
- 980 History of South America
  - 980 History of South America
  - 981 Brazil
  - 982 Argentina
  - 983 Chile
  - 984 Bolivia
  - 985 Peru
  - 986 Colombia and Ecuador
  - 987 Venezuela
  - 988 Guiana
  - 989 Paraguay and Uruguay
- 990 History of other areas
  - 990 History of Australasia, Pacific Ocean islands, Atlantic Ocean islands, Arctic islands, Antarctica, extraterrestrial worlds
  - 991–992 Not assigned or no longer used
  - 993 New Zealand
  - 994 Australia
  - 995 New Guinea and neighboring countries of Melanesia
  - 996 Polynesia and other Pacific Ocean islands
  - 997 Atlantic Ocean islands
  - 998 Arctic islands and Antarctica
  - 999 Extraterrestrial worlds

== See also ==
- Library of Congress Classification
- Comparison of Dewey and Library of Congress subject classification
- OCLC
- WorldCat
