= East Asian literature =

Literature in East Asian countries

East Asian literature is the diverse writings from the East Asian nations, China, Japan, Korea, Mongolia and Taiwan. Literature from this area emerges as a distinct and unique field of prose and poetry that embodies the cultural, social and political factors of each nation. Prose within East Asian countries reflects the rich cultural heritage from which specificities of language, form and style shape writings. Similarly, East Asian poetry exemplifies how the diverse culture and distinct environments influence East Asian Literature. Reflected through the poetic forms, images and language employed in writings. The development of East Asian literature has been subjugated to both local and international influences. The presence of Western literature and the transnational exchange reflects an interrelationship in which East Asian Literature has benefited from the communication of ideas and perspectives as well as contributed to broader literature movements.

East Asian literature includes:

- Chinese literature
- Japanese literature
- Korean literature
- Mongolian literature
- Taiwanese literature

== Prose ==
East Asian prose encapsulates a rich cultural heritage emerging from specific historical experiences, reflecting a diverse development of communication, identification and education. Prose within East Asia also plays a supporting role in the dissemination of certain political, religious and social agendas.

Early East Asian literature was deeply influenced by political and social agendas during a period of isolationism. The minimal contact between China, Japan and Korea during the nineteenth century reflects the common trend of isolationism as foreign policy. However, territorial conflicts which culminated in the Sino-Japanese War (1894–95) had an impactful role in the development of East Asian prose. This is confirmed by the increased presence of nationalist and patriotic themes. For example, Japanese poets such as Yosano Hiroshi and Masaoka Shiki called for existing traditional forms of prose to be imbued with notions of patriotism and martial bravery, whereas in China, a "poetry revolution" was instituted in the late Qing reform movement, where literature contained strong undertones of nationalistic ideals and qualities.

During the nineteenth century, East Asian literature became a powerful vehicle for expressing political ideologies and national identity. The infusion of political sentiment in East Asian prose is made clear in the depiction of the nation-state in China. Incorporating the predominant spiritual teachings of Confucius, literature often depicted Chinese involvement as harmonious, romanticising any expansionist and aggressive intentions. It echoes the notion of Chinese exceptionalism, demonstrating how Chinese prose often reflects a specific historical milieu.

Prose with East Asia also played a fundamental role in the construction and reinforcement of national identity. This is elucidated in Mongolian literature, particularly the prose of the early 20th century. Following the 1921 Mongolian Revolution, which was backed by the Soviet Army, Mongolian writers used prose to frame the ideology of socialism and its practice for those Mongolians who had little understanding of what it could offer them.

Literature became a tool to inculcate the public on aspects of a new socialist program that embodied the dissemination of writings on education, healthcare and religious beliefs in the new Mongolian state. The complex contextual influences shaped how Mongolian writers sought to extract revolutionary sentiment from the tropes and genres of folk literature. Consequently, there was a desire by writers to enhance and promote a new revolutionary society, embracing their connection to their homeland and rich cultural ancestry. The rich nomadic culture within Mongolia also informed their literature, with prose becoming a manifestation of the deep-rooted connections and intimacy to the land, wildlife and environment. It is through these literary works that Mongolian writers reaffirm traditional and cultural knowledge to be passed down. For example, Indigenous collections such as the Üliger-ün Dalai (The Sea of Stories).

== Poetry ==
East Asian poetry is a rich literary genre that contains unique linguistic forms, styles, and aesthetics. Poetry has been significant in the development of literary topics and expressions, often inspiring new forms and images. East Asian poetry explores a diverse collection of themes, motifs and archetypes that are critical to a nuanced understanding of literary styles. The symbolism within East Asian poetry often encapsulates the localised cultural experiences and philosophical ponderings of their respective state. Lee states that some preferred subjects within East Asian poetry are derived from universal and timeless themes.

The most common example is the symbolism and unique language of flora and fauna depictions. Within East Asian poetry, the strong penchant to employ visceral imagery that heavily incorporates naturalistic themes reflects a shared literary style which can be seen in Chinese poetry, Japanese imperial anthologies and Korean sijo poetry. For example, references regarding a Peach Blossom Spring, the chrysanthemum, and the five willows, influenced by T'ao Ch'ien's poetry are symbolic and representative of presenting an ideal place remote in time or space.

Within Chinese poetry, natural imagery has remained a hallmark of writings and a key literary technique employed since ancient times, the oldest preserved anthology of "songs" (shi 詩), The Book of Songs (c. 1000–600 BCE), an example of this. The imagery within Chinese poetry was used as figurative language, to deepen the meaning imbued in poetry, challenging the use of conventional images, and offering a more niche and creative interpretation. This created the scope for imaginative retelling and mythical imaging which reflected the oral cultural storytelling of the time. The images of Yin, representing "maleness" and "strength" and Yang representing "femaleness" and "softness" were frequently used as motifs within Chinese poetry. The recurring use of dichotomies reflects the spiritual teaching of Taoism, Chinese poetry often attributed gendered descriptions and metaphorical language to demark such differences. Themes in poetry were also gender marked through these cultural stereotypes, with themes of emotions, love and eroticism associated with femininity, compared with their male counterparts of philosophy, politics and warfare – representing masculine aesthetics.

The disparities in East Asian countries’ institutions, cultural beliefs, and literary tastes, can be signalled within their poetry. For example, in Chinese and Korean poetry, themes of friendships, parting and retirement are preferred and more frequent written, whereas, within Japanese poetry, there is a greater tendency and interest to explore concepts of the seasons and love.

== Influence ==
=== Foreign ===
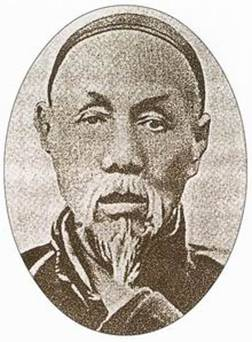
Lin Shu – Chinese translator

The Western world has played a pivotal role in the changing landscape of East Asian literature. The cultural, political and social exposure had a significant impact on the East Asian region which was translated into a shift in literature and cultural developments. One prominent example is the assimilation and adaption of Western literary conventions and techniques into Asian literature. In China, the growth of foreign literature was first introduced and circulated through journals and magazines. Western literature was revised and adapted to conform to the ethical beliefs of Confucianism, reflecting socio-political factors. For example, translator Lin Shu translated Harriet Beecher Stowe's Uncle Tom's Cabin to Black Slave's Cry to Heaven, where he "connects the brutality against black slaves to contemporary US discrimination against Chinese immigrants and the fate of China in the face of repeated military and diplomatic humiliations by Western powers" (Liu, 2007, p. 415). Shu's use of the classical styles of chuanqi (Tang dynasty) and ci (Song dynasty), paired with similar structuring principles and techniques between foreign and Chinese literature pieces was driven by an agenda to create an optimistic outlook on foreign literature. Similarly, this influence was seen present in other forms of literature, namely poetry, in the rendition and dramatization of William Shakespeare's The Merchant of Venice renamed Contract of Flesh by Zheng Zhengqiu.

Japan's rise as a regional power demonstrated in its victory in the Sino-Japanese War (1894–95) and the Russo-Japanese War (1904–05), colonizing Taiwan, and annexing Korea in 1910, was impactful on literary developments. Simultaneously, China's military and territorial losses to both Western powers and Japan were also reflected in their respective literature and adaptions. For example, forms of Japanese and Chinese theatre (shinpa and wenmingxi) adaptions both actively sought to reflect these geopolitical concerns and dynamics, using original creations and adaptations from European poetry and plays. For example, William Shakespeare's Othello was adapted to reflect the tumultuous climate on both a national and international scale. Interestingly, the systemic appropriation of Western texts also gave rise to a fascist, pro-imperialist, and belligerently anti-Western discourse throughout China, Japan, Korea and Taiwan.

=== Domestic ===
Cross-cultural exchange and social-political factors have also shaped regional exchange; thus, altering the development of literature in other East Asian nations. The constant flow of people, ideas and cultural products between East Asian nations, signals a broader exchange network which influenced the development of literature. Within East Asia, foreign oppression in China paired with Japan's emergence as a superpower towards the end of the 19th century radically transformed the contact and interaction among East Asian peoples and their literature.

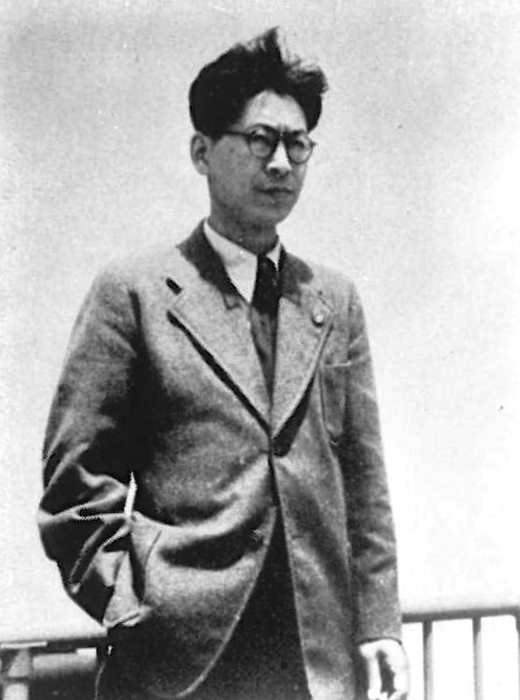
Nakano Shigeharu - Japanese poet and writer

Additionally, the cross-cultural exchange gave rise to literacy inspiration. For example, Chinese vernacular novels, such as The Water Margin, The Story of the Stone, and Monkey, inspired the new genre in Japan called, "Yomihon"; historical romances written in prose. Moreover, some literary works became mouthpieces for nationalistic perspectives of their critical commentary on neighbouring cultural goods. For example, some Chinese, Korean, and Taiwanese writers both affirmed and denied Japanese imperial cultural authority through the incorporation of their literary works; which both contributed to the survival of these texts and simultaneously resisted the cultural Japanese discourse through rigorous criticism.

This is further explored through the exchanges of Japanese and Korean literary works in the early 20th century. Nakano Shigeharu was a leading poet and organiser of Japan's prewar proletarian literary movement. Within his poem "Ame no furu Shinagawa eki" (Shinagawa Station in the Rain, May 1929) which is riddled with censorship marks, he writes of the eventual glorious return to Japan of Korean revolutionaries who were deported on the enthronement of the Sho ̄wa emperor. The anti-imperial sentiment was quickly and anonymously translated into Korean as "Pi nal-i nu ̆n P’umch’o ̆n-yo ̆k", and creative liberties were taken by leading Korean revolutionary poet Im Hwa (1908–53) in "Usan pat-u ̆ n Yok’ohama u ̆ i pudu" (Yokohama Pier under the Umbrella, August 1929) which provided potential writings for the censored lines. "Pi nal-i nu ̆n P’umch’o ̆n-yo ̆k" translates the Japanese poem's censorship marks into lines that unflatteringly corporealize the emperor, undermining the Japanese Imperial authority, mocking its censorship and calling for aggressive violence on the Japanese emperor. Hence, it Is evident that through that literature was harnessed as a tool to appeal to nationalistic and patriotist agendas.

Luo Guanzhong's – Romance of the Three Kingdoms (14th century)

This was also similar in China, where Chinese writers were motivated to persevere national dignity, while simultaneously criticising Japanese aggression and expansion. For example, Japanese writer Ishikawa Tatsuzō’s banned novella Ikiteiru heitai (March 1998) depicts the brutality of Chinese soldiers through slaughtering, looting, raping and murdering, revealing Japanese anxieties about the war and its effects on individuals and communities. The text is transformed through the translation by a Chinese writer, Bai Mu which alters the text to Weisi de bing (Soldiers Not Yet Deceased). This distortion of Ishikawa's work tells a completely different narrative of Japanese brutality while omitting any negative depiction of Chinese atrocities committed. Thus, East Asian literature was deeply influenced by geopolitical concerns and neighbouring tensions as the constant use of transformational intertextuality in East Asian literature to promote certain narratives.

Neighbouring East Asian nations also provided creative inspiration as seen by the role of Chinese literature in the development of Mongolian literature. This is seen through translations of Chinese novels, which gave rise to the development of a distinct Mongolian literary style. This influence is prevalent in the first Mongolian novels, where Mongolian authors adopted Chinese literary techniques and creative elements, for example, through plots, the manner of character development and description, and the organisation of the narrative and narrative style. Chinese novels, hence, became a basis for the creation in the mid-nineteenth century of the first Mongolian novels. For example, within The Blue Chronicle by Koke Sudar, there are sections inspired by corresponding passages from Luo Guanzhong's Romance of the Three Kingdoms, or Cao Xuejin's Dream of the Red Chamber.
