= Law in South America =

The law of South America is one of the most unified in the world. All countries but Guyana can be said to follow civil law systems, although recent developments in the law of Brazil suggest a move towards the stare decisis doctrine.

== Supranational agreements ==
- Andean Community
- Mercosur
- Union of South American Nations

== Countries ==
- Law of Argentina
- Law of Bolivia
- Law of Brazil
- Law of Chile
- Law of Colombia
- Law of Ecuador
- Law of Guyana
- Law of Panama
- Law of Paraguay
- Law of Peru
- Law of Suriname
- Law of Trinidad and Tobago
- Law of Uruguay
- Law of Venezuela

== Territories ==
- Law of Aruba
- Law of Falkland Islands
- Law of French Guiana
- Law of South Georgia and the South Sandwich Islands

== See also ==
- Energy law
- Legal systems of the world
