= East Asian poetry =

East Asian poetry may refer to:

- Chinese poetry
- Korean poetry
- Japanese poetry
- Vietnamese poetry
