= Celtic literature =

Literature from or relating to the Celtic nations

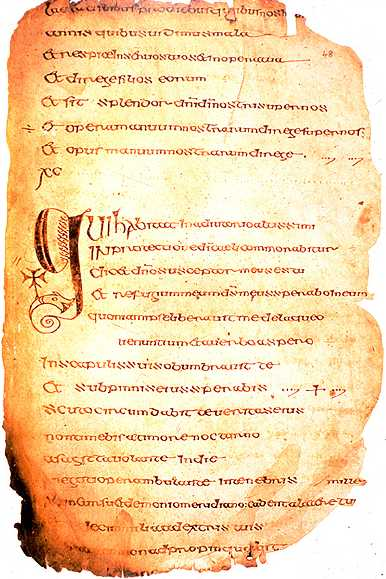
The Cathach of St. Columba, one of the earliest instances of written Celtic language

Celtic literature is the body of literature written in one of the Celtic languages, or else it may popularly refer to literature written in other languages which is based on the traditional narratives found in early Celtic literature.

== Background ==
In the strictly academic context of Celtic studies, the term Celtic literature is used by Celticists to denote any number of bodies of literature written in a Celtic language, encompassing the Irish, Welsh, Cornish, Manx, Scottish Gaelic, and Breton languages in either their modern or earlier forms.

Alternatively, the term is often used in a popular context to refer to literature that is written in a non-Celtic language but originates nonetheless from the Celtic nations or else displays subjects or themes identified as "Celtic". Examples of this literature include the medieval Arthurian romances written in the French language, which drew heavily from Celtic sources, or in a modern context literature in the English language by writers of Irish, Welsh, Cornish, Manx, Scottish or Breton extraction. Literature in Scots and Ulster Scots may also be included within the concept. In this broader sense, the applicability of the term "Celtic literature" can vary as widely as the use of the term "Celt" itself.

For information on the development of particular national literatures, see: Irish literature, Scottish literature, Welsh literature, Literature in Cornish, Breton literature and Manx literature.

== Revival literature in non-Celtic languages ==
The Gaelic Revival reintroduced Celtic themes into modern literature. The concept of Celticity encouraged cross-fertilisation between Celtic cultures.

There have been modern texts based around Celtic literature. Bernard Cornwell writes about the Arthurian legends in his series The Warlord Chronicles. Other writers of Celtic literature in English include Dylan Thomas and Sian James.

== Themes from Celtic Literature within Arthurian Romances ==
Within many Arthurian texts, one can see the influence of Celtic literature and folklore. Arthurian legends with these components include Marie de France's Lanval, the tale of Sir Gawain and the Green Knight, and Perceval, The Story of the Grail. In his work "Celtic Elements in Lavenal and Graelent," Cross claims that Lanval is a medieval narrative called, "Brenton Lays" otherwise known as works that claim descent from Celtic tradition. Sir Gawain and the Green Knight is said to contain traditions from early Irish Lore, such as the Beheading test. In addition to Sir Gawain and the Green Knight and Lanval, Perceval, The Story of the Grail contains a combination of these two Celtic themes. While there are other tales whose Celtic elements can be examined, these three are most likely among the best examples.

A major aspect of Celtic literature within "Lanval" is the theme itself, the story of a fairy mistress who falls in love with a mortal. In the story Lanval by Marie de France, an unpopular knight of the court becomes the lover of a mysterious and otherworldly woman. Though he breaks his promise to keep their love a secret, he is eventually reunited with her (Marie de France 154-167). Cross states that, "The influence one medieval romance of Celtic stories involving both the fairy mistress and the Journey to the Otherworld has long since been recognized". While we are never told whether or not Lanval's lover is a fairy, it is most certain that she is a woman of supernatural origin. You can even find a very similar example to the story of "Lanval" in the Irish story called "Aidead Muirchertaig maic Erca". One of the only differences between the original Irish stories and that of "Lanval" is the fact that Marie de France's story is more Christianized and erases any overtly Pagan elements. There are also many other examples of a fairy mistress bestowing favor upon a mortal man within Irish folklore. After providing many examples of this theme within early Celtic literature, Cross states that, "Those given (examples) above demonstrate beyond the possibility of doubt that stories of fee who hanker after mortal earth-born lovers and who visit mortal soil in search of their mates existed in early Celtic tradition…".

In "Sir Gaiwan and the Green Knight" the theme of the Beheading Test is prevalent. According to Alice Buchanan's article: "The Irish Framework of Sir Gawin and the Green Knight," she states: the theme of Beheading texts, which occurs in Arthurian Romances, French, English, and German, from about 1180 – 1380, is derived from an Irish tradition actually existent in a MS. Written before 1106" In "Sir Gaiwan and the Green Knight," it's Gawain's head which is at stake. This is where the "Beheading Game" comes into place. This is when a supernatural challenger offers to let his head be cut off in exchange for a return blow. It is said that the first texts in which the "Beheading Game" is shown is in the Middle Irish tale of Bricriu's Feast. However, the Gawain poets put a spin on the simple beheading game by linking it with themes of truth. It is also frequently stated that the Gawin poet was the first to unite the beheading game with the themes of temptation.

The Celtic motifs of the "Beheading Game" and temptation are also apparent in the French romance, Perceval, The Story of the Grail and the following continuations of the story by Chretien which are believed to parallel Sir Gawain and the Green Knight in plot (Grant 7). The early French character known as Caradoc is thought to be one of the first Arthurian characters to use the beheading game as a means to figure out whom his birth father is. The theme of temptation falls into place as many characters fall into the trap of seduction by other people and also by wizards and other mythological creatures that are known to be of Celtic origin (Chrétien).

Celtic mythology also displays itself in "Sir Gaiwain and the Green Knight." Looking at Gaiwan, we see him as the leading leader at the Primary Table in which he is tested by the rulers of the otherworld in terms of his fitness for fame in this world and the next. With this in mind, the "rulers of the otherworld" have a mythical nature to them; there are references to sun gods, and old and new gods. It might seem as though that would be taking the mythological concept and simplifying it, however in Celtic mythology, the traits of individual and groups of gods are not so distinct.

== See also ==
- Breton literature
- Cornish literature
- Irish literature
- Manx literature
- Scottish literature
- Medieval Welsh literature
- Welsh-language literature
- Welsh literature in English

== Bibliography ==
- Buchanan, Alice (1932). "The Irish Framework of Gawain and the Green Knight". PMLA. 47 (2): 315–338. doi:10.2307/457878. ISSN 0030-8129. JSTOR 457878. S2CID 163424643.
- Cross, Tom Peete (1915). "The Celtic Elements in the Lays of "Lanval" and "Graelent"". Modern Philology. 12 (10): 585–644. doi:10.1086/386982. ISSN 0026-8232. JSTOR 432976. S2CID 162292496.
- Greenblatt, Stephen (11 June 2018). The Norton Anthology of English Literature: Tenth Edition Volume E (10th ed.). W.W. Norton & Company. ISBN 978-0-393-60306-4.
- Kelleher, John V. (1950). "Matthew Arnold and the Celtic Revival". Perspectives of Criticism. Harvard University Press. pp. 197–222. doi:10.4159/harvard.9780674864269.c8. ISBN 978-0-674-86426-9.
- Loganbill, Dean (1972). "The Medieval Mind in "Sir Gawain and the Green Knight"". The Bulletin of the Rocky Mountain Modern Language Association. 26 (4): 119–126. doi:10.2307/1346549. ISSN 0035-7626. JSTOR 1346549.
- Prior, Sandra Pierson (1994). "Chapter 5: Sir Gawain and the Green Knight". The pearl poet revisited. New York : Twayne; Toronto : Maxwell Macmillan Canada; New York : Maxwell Macmillan International. ISBN 978-0-8057-4516-0.
- "Celtic literature". Britannica.
