= Law in Europe =

The law of Europe refers to the legal systems of Europe. Europe saw the birth of both the Roman Empire and the British Empire, which form the basis of the two dominant forms of legal system of private law, civil and common law.

== History ==
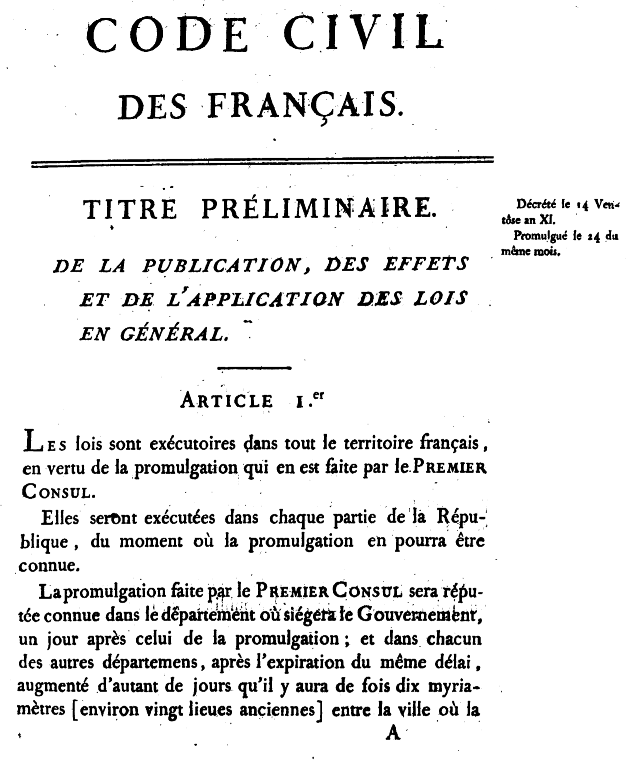
First page of the 1804 edition of the Napoleonic Code.

The law of Europe has a diverse history. Roman law underwent major codification in the Corpus Juris Civilis of Emperor Justinian, as later developed through the Middle Ages by medieval legal scholars. In Medieval England, judges retained greater power than their continental counterparts and began to develop a body of precedent. Originally civil law was one common legal system in much of Europe, but with the rise of nationalism in the 17th century Nordic countries and around the time of the French Revolution, it became fractured into separate national systems. This change was brought about by the development of separate national codes, of which the French Napoleonic Code, the Austrian Code, German and Swiss codes were the most influential. Around this time civil law incorporated many ideas associated with the Enlightenment. The European Union's Law is based on a codified set of laws, laid down in the Treaties. Law in the EU is however mixed with precedent in case law of the European Court of Justice. In accordance with its history, the interpretation of European law relies less on policy considerations than U.S. law.

== Supranational law ==
- Council of Europe
- European Union law
- European Convention on Human Rights

== Law by countries ==
- Law of Albania
- Law of Andorra
- Law of Armenia
- Law of Austria
- Law of Azerbaijan
- Law of Belarus
- Law of Belgium
- Law of Bosnia and Herzegovina
- Law of Bulgaria
- Law of Croatia
- Law of Cyprus
- Law of Czech Republic
- Law of Denmark
- Law of Estonia
- Law of Finland
- Law of France
- Law of Georgia
- Law of Germany
- Law of Greece
- Law of Hungary
- Law of Iceland
- Law of the Republic of Ireland
- Law of Italy
- Law of Kazakhstan
- Law of Latvia
- Law of Liechtenstein
- Law of Lithuania
- Law of Luxembourg
- Law of Republic of Macedonia
- Law of Malta
- Law of Moldova
- Law of Monaco
- Law of Montenegro
- Law of the Netherlands
- Law of Northern Cyprus
- Law of Norway
- Law of Poland
- Law of Portugal
- Law of Romania
- Law of Russia
- Law of San Marino
- Law of Serbia
- Law of Slovakia
- Law of Slovenia
- Law of Spain
- Law of Sweden
- Law of Switzerland
- Law of Turkey
- Law of Ukraine
- Law of United Kingdom
  - Law of England and Wales
  - Law of Northern Ireland
  - Law of Scotland
- Law of Vatican City State

== Dependencies, autonomies and territories ==
- Law of Abkhazia
- Law of Åland
- Law of Akrotiri and Dhekelia
- Law of Crimea
- Law of the Faroe Islands
- Law of Gibraltar
- Law of Guernsey
- Law of the Isle of Man
- Law of Jersey
- Law of Nagorno-Karabakh
- Law of Nakhichevan
- Law of Turkish Republic of Northern Cyprus

== See also ==
- Legal systems of the world
