= List of national legal systems =

System for interpreting and enforcing the laws

Legal systems of the world

The contemporary national legal systems are generally based on one of four major legal traditions: civil law, common law, customary law, religious law or combinations of these. However, the legal system of each country is shaped by its unique history and so incorporates individual variations. The science that studies law at the level of legal systems is called comparative law.

Both civil (also known as Roman) and common law systems can be considered the most widespread in the world: civil law because it is the most widespread by landmass and by population overall, and common law because the greatest number of people employ it compared to any single civil law system.

== Civil law ==
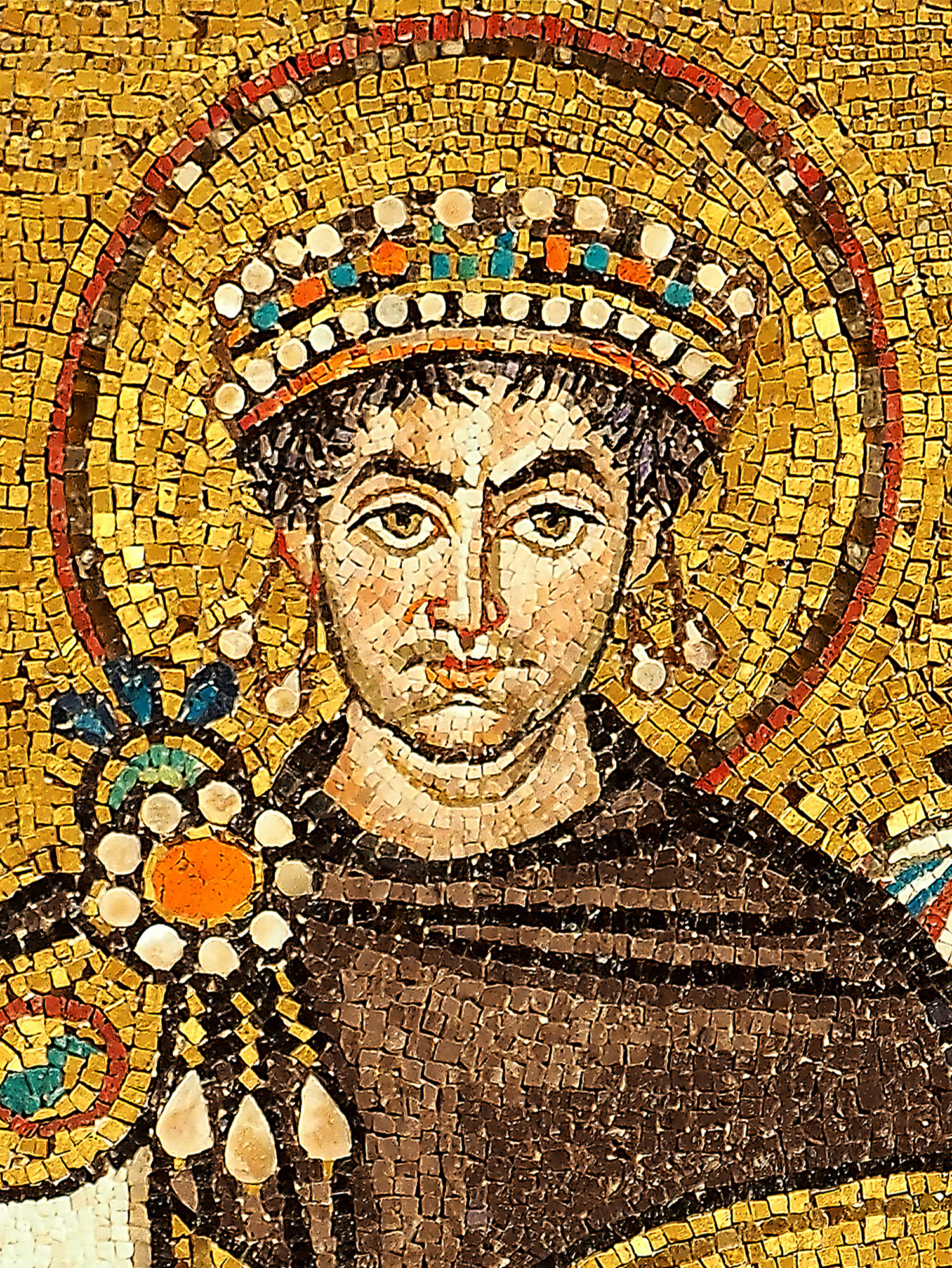
Emperor Justinian I, author of what became the foundational texts of the civil law tradition.

The source of law that is recognized as authoritative is codifications in a constitution or statute passed by legislature, to amend a code. While the concept of codification dates back to the Code of Hammurabi in Babylon ca. 1790 BC, civil law systems derive from the Roman Empire and, more particularly, the Corpus Juris Civilis issued by the Emperor Justinian ca. AD 529. This was an extensive reform of the law in the Byzantine Empire, bringing it together into codified documents. Civil law was also partly influenced by religious laws such as Canon law and Islamic law. Civil law today, in theory, is interpreted rather than developed or made by judges. Only legislative enactments (rather than legal precedents, as in common law) are considered legally binding.

Scholars of comparative law and economists promoting the legal origins theory usually subdivide civil law into distinct groups:

- French civil law: in France, the Benelux countries, Italy, Romania, Spain, and former colonies of those countries, mainly in Latin America, Africa, and the Middle East;
- German civil law: in Germany, Austria, Russia, Switzerland, Estonia, Latvia, Bosnia and Herzegovina, Croatia, Kosovo*, North Macedonia, Montenegro, Slovenia, Serbia, Greece, Portugal and its former colonies, Turkey, and East Asian countries including Japan, South Korea, and Taiwan (Republic of China);
- Scandinavian civil law: in Northern Europe such as Denmark, Norway, Finland, Iceland, and Sweden. As historically integrated into the Scandinavian cultural sphere, Finland and Iceland also inherited the system, although especially Iceland has its own legal roots. Scandinavian or Nordic civil law exhibits the least similar traits to other civil law systems. It is sometimes considered a legal system in its own right, despite its reception being mainly from German civil law.

However, some of these legal systems are often and more correctly said to be of a hybrid nature:

- Napoleonic to Germanistic influence (Italian civil law)

The Italian civil code of 1942 replaced the original one of 1865, introducing germanistic elements due to the geopolitical alliances of the time. The Italian approach has been imitated by other countries including Portugal (1966), the Netherlands (1992), Lithuania (2000), Brazil (2002) and Argentina (2014). Most of them have innovations introduced by the Italian legislation, including the unification of the civil and commercial codes.

- Germanistic to Napoleonic influence (Swiss civil law)

The Swiss civil code is considered to be mainly influenced by the German civil code and partly by the French civil code. The civil code of the Republic of Turkey is a slightly modified version of the Swiss code, adopted in 1926 during Mustafa Kemal Atatürk's presidency as part of the government's progressive reforms and secularization.

A comprehensive list of countries that base their legal system on a codified civil law follows:

Country	Description
Albania	Based on Napoleonic civil law.
Angola	Based on Portuguese civil law.
Argentina	The Spanish legal tradition had a great influence on the Civil Code of Argentina, basically a work of the Argentine jurist Dalmacio Vélez Sársfield, who dedicated five years of his life to this task. The Civil Code came into effect on 1 January 1871. Beyond the influence of the Spanish legal tradition, the Argentine Civil Code was also inspired by the Draft of the Brazilian Civil Code, the Draft of the Spanish Civil Code of 1851, the Napoleonic Code, and the Chilean Civil Code. The sources of this Civil Code also include various theoretical legal works, mainly of the great French jurists of the 19th century. It was the first Civil Law to adopt, as its cornerstone consciously, the distinction between i. rights and obligations and ii. real property rights, thus distancing itself from the French model. The Argentine Civil Code was also in effect in Paraguay under a Paraguayan law of 1880 until the new Civil Code came into force in 1987. In Argentina, this 1871 Civil Code remained in force until August 2015, when it was replaced by the new Código Civil y Comercial de la Nación. During the second half of the 20th century, the German legal theory became increasingly influential in Argentina.
Andorra	Courts apply the customary laws of Andorra, supplemented with Roman law and customary Catalan law.
Armenia	Based on German civil law.
Aruba	Based on Dutch civil law
Austria	Based on Roman and Germanic Civil law. The Allgemeines bürgerliches Gesetzbuch (ABGB) of 1811. Both Roman and Austrian law traditions influence the ABGB. Like the Napoleonic Code, it is based on the ideals of freedom and equality before the law.
Azerbaijan	Based on German, French, Russian, and traditional Azerbaijani Law
Belarus	Based on Germanic Civil law (administrative, criminal codes)
Belgium	The Napoleonic Code is still in use, although it is heavily modified (especially concerning family law)
Benin	Based on Napoleonic Civil law.
Bolivia	Influenced by the Napoleonic Code
Bosnia and Herzegovina	Influenced by Austrian law. The Swiss civil law (Zivilgesetzbuch) was a model for the Law on Obligations of 1978.
Brazil	Based on German, Italian, French, and Portuguese law. However, in 2004, the Federal Constitution was amended to grant the Supreme Federal Court authority to issue binding precedents (súmulas vinculantes) to settle controversies involving constitutional law. This mechanism echoes the stare decisis principle typically found in common law systems.
Bulgaria	Germanic and Roman law systems influence the Civil Law system
Burkina Faso	Based on the French civil law
Burundi	Based on the French civil law
Chad	Based on the French civil law
People's Republic of China	Based on Germanic Civil law and French Civil law, also with influences from the Soviet Socialist law from Soviet Union
Republic of the Congo	Based on the Napoleonic Civil law.
Democratic Republic of the Congo	Based on Belgian civil law
Cambodia	
Cape Verde	Based on Portuguese civil law
Central African Republic	Based on the French civil law system
Chile	The Chilean Civil Code, based on the Napoleonic Civil Law, was also heavily influenced by the Spanish legal tradition. In turn, the Chilean civil code, to a large degree, influenced the drafting of the civil codes of other Latin-American states. For instance, the codes of Ecuador (1861) and Colombia (1873) constituted faithful reproductions of the Chilean code, but for very few exceptions. The compiler of the Civil Code of Chile, Venezuelan Andrés Bello, worked for its completion for almost 30 years, using elements of the Spanish law on the one hand, and of other Western laws, especially of the French one, on the other. It is noted that he consulted and used all the codes issued up to then, dating back to the era of Justinian. The Civil Code came into effect on 1 January 1857. The influence of the Napoleonic Code and the Law of Castile of the Spanish colonial period (especially the Siete Partidas), is great; it is observed however that e.g. in many provisions of property or contract law, the solutions of the French code civil were put aside in favor of pure Roman law or Castilian law.
Colombia	Based on the Chilean Civil Law. The Civil Code was introduced in 1873. Nearly faithful reproduction of the Chilean civil code
Costa Rica	Based on the Napoleonic Civil Law. The First Civil Code (part of the General Code or Carrillo Code) came into effect in 1841; its text was inspired by the South Peruvian Civil Code of Marshal Andres de Santa Cruz. The present Civil Code took effect on 1 January 1888 and was influenced by the Napoleonic Code and the Spanish Civil Code of 1889 (based on its 1851 draft).
Croatia	Based on the Germanic Civil Law. The German and Austrian legal systems largely influence the Croatian legal system. It is significantly influenced by the Civil Code of the Austrian Empire from 1811, known in Croatia as "General Civil Law" ("Opći građanski zakon"). OGZ was in force from 1853 to 1946. After the World War II, Croatia became a member of the Yugoslav Federation, which enacted in 1946 the "Law on immediate voiding of regulations passed before April 6, 1941, and during the enemy occupation" ("Zakon o nevaženju pravnih proposal donesenih prije 6. travnja 1941. i za vrijeme neprijateljske okupacije"). By this law, OGZ was declared invalid in its entirety, but the implementation of certain of its legal provisions was approved. During the post-War era, the Croatian legal system became influenced by elements of the socialist law. Croatian civil law was pushed aside, and norms of public law and the legal regulation of social ownership were adopted. After Croatia declared independence from Yugoslavia on 25 June 1991, the previous legal system served as the basis for drafting new laws. "The Law on Obligations" ("Zakon o obveznim odnosima") was enacted in 2005. Today, Croatia as a European Union member state implements elements of the EU acquis into its legal system.
Cuba	Influenced by Spanish and American law with large elements of Communist legal theory.
Curaçao	Based on Dutch Civil Law.
Czech Republic	Based on Germanic civil law. Descended from the Civil Code of the Austrian Empire (1811), influenced by German (1939–45) and Soviet (1947/68–89) legal codes during occupation periods, substantially reformed to remove Soviet influence and elements of socialist law after the Velvet Revolution (1989). The new Civil Code of the Czech Republic was introduced in 2014, reestablishing the norms of the ABGB and reintroducing its terms and concepts.
Denmark	Based on North Germanic law. Scandinavian-North Germanic civil law.
Dominican Republic	Based on the Napoleonic Code
Ecuador	Based on the Chilean civil law. The Civil Code was introduced in 1861.
Egypt	Based on Napoleonic civil law and Islamic law.
Equatorial Guinea	
El Salvador	Based on the law.
Estonia	Based on German civil law.
Ethiopia	
Finland	Based on Nordic law.
France	Based on Napoleonic Code (code civil of 1804)
Gabon	Based on the French civil law system
Guinea	Based on the French civil law system, customary law, and decree
Guinea-Bissau	Based on Portuguese civil law
(Georgia (country)) Georgia	Based on Napoleonic civil law
Germany	Based on Germanic civil law. The Bürgerliches Gesetzbuch of 1900 ("BGB"). Both Roman and German law traditions influence the BGB.
Greece	Based on Germanic civil law. The Greek civil code of 1946, highly influenced by traditional Roman law and the German civil code of 1900 (Bürgerliches Gesetzbuch); the Greek civil code replaced the Byzantine–Roman civil law in effect in Greece since its independence (Νομική Διάταξη της Ανατολικής Χέρσου Ελλάδος, Legal Provision of Eastern Mainland Greece, November 1821: 'Οι Κοινωνικοί Νόμοι των Αειμνήστων Χριστιανών Αυτοκρατόρων της Ελλάδος μόνοι ισχύουσι κατά το παρόν εις την Ανατολικήν Χέρσον Ελλάδα', 'The Social [i.e. Civil] Laws of the Dear Departed Christian Emperors of Greece [referring to the Byzantine Emperors] alone are in effect at present in Eastern Mainland Greece')
Guatemala	Based on Napoleonic civil law. Guatemala has had three Civil Codes: the first from 1877, a new one introduced in 1933, and the one currently in force, passed in 1963. This Civil Code has undergone reforms over the years, as well as a few derogations concerning areas subsequently regulated by newer laws, such as the Code of Commerce and the Law of the National Registry of Persons. In general, it follows the tradition of the Roman-French system of civil codification. Regarding the theory of 'sources of law' in the Guatemalan legal system, the 'Ley del Organismo Judicial' recognizes 'the law' as the main legal source (in the sense of legislative texts). However, it also establishes 'jurisprudence' as a complementary source. Although jurisprudence technically refers to judicial decisions in general, in practice it tends to be confused and identified with the concept of 'legal doctrine', which is a qualified series of identical resolutions in similar cases pronounced by higher courts (the Constitutional Court acting as a 'Tribunal de Amparo', and the Supreme Court acting as a 'Tribunal de Casación') whose theses become binding for lower courts.
Haiti	Based on Napoleonic civil law.
Honduras	
Hungary	Based on Germanic, codified Roman law with elements from Napoleonic civil law.
Iceland	Based on North Germanic law. Medieval Norwegian and Danish laws influenced Germanic traditional laws.
India (former French and Portuguese colonies)	Based on Portuguese civil law (Goa, and Dadra and Nagar Haveli and Daman and Diu), and French civil law (Puducherry). Vedic Hindu legal traditions also influenced the legal system in India.
Italy	Based on the Italian Civil Code of 1942 and earlier codes influenced by French and German law, the civil-law system is generally uniform throughout the country. However, several territories retain special institutions derived from former Austrian law. In Trentino-Alto Adige/Südtirol and Friuli-Venezia Giulia, and in certain municipalities of Udine, Brescia, Belluno and Vicenza, the Austrian-derived tavolare (Libro fondiario) system of land registration remains in force. In South Tyrol, the maso chiuso (closed farm) institution, governed by special provincial legislation, preserves certain agricultural holdings as indivisible residential and farming units. In Friuli-Venezia Giulia, the Libro fondiario continues to operate in the former Austrian territories of Trieste, Gorizia and parts of Udine, with the Friuli-Venezia Giulia regional government possessing legislative and administrative powers concerning its establishment and maintenance."Cos'è il libro fondiario". Regione Autonoma Friuli Venezia Giulia."I princìpi fondamentali del sistema tavolare". Regione Autonoma Friuli Venezia Giulia."Il maso chiuso". Provincia autonoma di Bolzano.
Ivory Coast	Based on the French civil law system
Japan	Based on Germanic civil law and the Japanese civil code of 1895. However, Japanese law does include common law elements: the 1948 Japanese Code of Criminal Procedure provides that verdicts from lower courts that conflict with Supreme Court precedents may be used as evidence on appeal. A precedent is considered stronger if resulting from a verdict made in the Grand Bench. Therefore, while Supreme Court precedents do not necessarily force courts to uphold them, they are studied extensively by Japanese law students.
Latvia	Based on Napoleonic and German civil law, as it was historically before the Soviet occupation. While general principles of law are prerequisites for making and interpreting the law, case law is also regularly applied to present legal arguments in courts and to explain the law's application in similar cases. Civil law is largely modeled on the Napoleonic Code, with strong elements of German civil law. Criminal law retains Russian and German legal traditions, while criminal procedure law has been fully modeled after the practice accepted in Western Europe. The civil law of Latvia was enacted in 1937.
Lebanon	Based on Napoleonic civil law.
Lithuania	Modeled after Dutch civil law
Louisiana ( (United States) U.S.)	Law in the state of Louisiana is based on French and Spanish civil law. Federal courts and 49 states use the legal system based on English common law (see below), which has diverged somewhat since the mid-nineteenth century in that they look to each other's cases for guidance on issues of the first impression and rarely look at contemporary cases on the same issue in the UK or the Commonwealth.
Luxembourg	Based on Napoleonic civil law.
Macau (P.R.China)	Principally based on Portuguese civil law, also influenced by PRC law.
Mexico	Based on Napoleonic civil law."The origins of Mexico's legal system are both ancient and classical, based on the Roman and French legal systems, and the Mexican system shares more in common with other legal systems throughout the world (especially those in Latin America and most of continental Europe) ..."
Mongolia	Based on Germanic civil law.
Montenegro	Based on Napoleonic and German civil law. First: the General Property Code for the Principality of Montenegro of 1888, written by Valtazar Bogišić. Present: the Law on Obligations of 2008.
Mozambique	Based on Portuguese civil law
Netherlands	Based on Napoleonic Code with German law influence
Nepal	Based on Civil Code, however, the principle of stare decisis is widely practised. The legal system of Nepal has been influenced by British Legal System
North Macedonia	
Norway	Scandinavian-North Germanic civil law, based on North Germanic law. King Magnus VI the Lawmender unified the regional laws into a single code of law for the whole kingdom in 1274. This was replaced by Christian V's Norwegian Code of 1687.
Panama	
Paraguay	The Paraguayan Civil Code, in force since 1987, is largely influenced by the Napoleonic Code and the Argentine Code
Peru	Based on the civil law system. accepts compulsory International Court of Justice ICJ jurisdiction.
Poland	The system is highly syncretic combining the Napoleonic Code, strong influences from the German civil law (BGB) and Austrian civil law (ABGB) with indigenous laws. The Polish Civil Code has been in force since 1965.
Portugal	Influenced by the Napoleonic Code and later by the German civil law.
Romania	Civil Code came into force in 2011. Based on the Civil Code of Quebec, but also influenced by the Napoleonic Code and other French-inspired codes (such as those of Italy, Spain, and Switzerland)
Russia	Civil Law system descendant from Roman Law through Byzantine tradition. Heavily influenced by German and Dutch norms in the 1700s. Socialist-style modifications from the 1920s on, and Continental European Civil Law influences since the 1990s.
Rwanda	Mixture of Belgian civil law and English common law
São Tomé and Príncipe	Based on Portuguese civil law
Serbia	First: the Civil Code of Principality of Serbia of 1844, written by Jovan Hadžić, was influenced by the Austrian Civil Code (Allgemeines bürgerliches Gesetzbuch). Present: The Swiss civil law (Zivilgesetzbuch) was a model for the Law on Obligations of 1978.
Slovakia	Descended from the Civil Code of the Austrian Empire (1811), influenced by German (1939–45) and Soviet (1947/68–89) legal codes during occupation periods, substantially reformed to remove Soviet influence and elements of socialist law after the Velvet Revolution (1989).
Slovenia	A Civil Law system influenced mostly by Germanic and Austro-Hungarian law systems
South Korea	Based on the German civil law system. Also largely influenced by Japanese civil law, which itself is modeled after the German one. Korean Civil Code was introduced 1958 and fully enacted by 1960.
Spain	Influenced by the Napoleonic Code, it also incorporates elements of Spain's legal tradition, beginning with the Siete Partidas, a major legislative achievement of the Middle Ages. That body of law remained more or less unchanged until the 19th century, when the first civil codes were drafted, merging both the Napoleonic style with the Castilian traditions. Aragon, (Balearic Islands) Balearics, the (Basque Country (autonomous community)) Basque Country, Catalonia, (Galicia (Spain)) Galicia, and Navarre still have its own private law (the so-called foral law) which predates and survived the Spanish process of uniformisation, in the Catalan case, its private law is currently fully codificated in the form of the Civil Code of Catalonia.
Suriname	Based on Dutch civil law
Sweden	Scandinavian-North Germanic civil law. Like all Scandinavian legal systems, it is distinguished by its traditional character and by the fact that it did not adopt elements of Roman law. It assimilated very few elements of foreign laws whatsoever. The Napoleonic Code had no influence on the codification of law in Scandinavia. The historical basis of the law of Sweden, just as for all Nordic countries, is North Germanic law. Codification of the law started in Sweden during the 18th century, preceding the codifications of most other European countries. However, neither Sweden nor any other Nordic state created a civil code of the kind of the Code Civil or the BGB.
Switzerland	The Swiss Civil Code of 1908 and 1912 (obligations; fifth book)
Syria	Based on Napoleonic civil law.
Taiwan (Republic of China)	Influenced by German Civil Code and Japanese Six Codes. Enacted in 1931.
Timor-Leste	Based on Portuguese civil law
Turkey	Modeled after the Swiss civil law (Zivilgesetzbuch) of 1907.
Ukraine	Based on German civil law, it was accepted in 2004.
Uruguay	The basis for its public law is the 1967 Constitution, amended in 1989, 1994, 1996, and 2004. There is a clear separation of powers among the three branches of government. Private relationships are governed by the Uruguayan Civil Code.
Uzbekistan	Represents an evolution of Soviet civil law. The overwhelmingly strong impact of the Communist legal theory is traceable.
Vietnam	Based on Communist legal theory, influenced by French civil law.
Venezuela	Based on Napoleonic civil law. Spanish legal traditions also influenced the civil law system in Venezuela.

== Common law ==
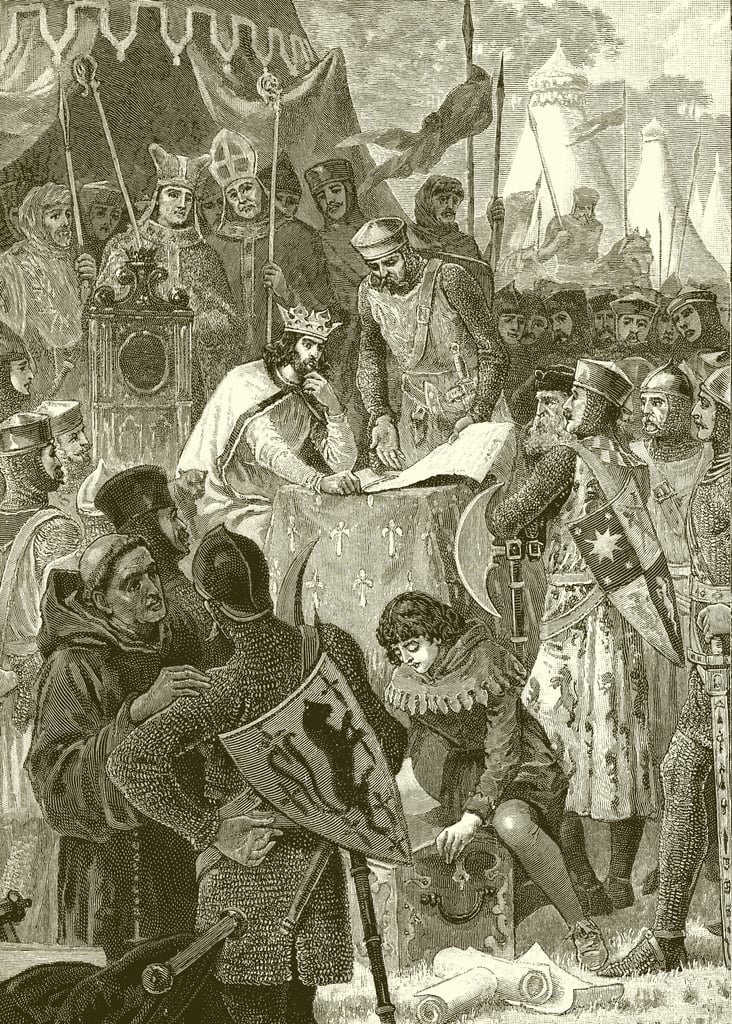
King John of England signs Magna Carta.

Common law and equity are systems of law whose sources are the decisions in cases by judges. In addition, every system will have a legislature that passes new laws and statutes. The relationships between statutes and judicial decisions can be complex. In some jurisdictions, such statutes may overrule judicial decisions or codify the subject matter of several contradictory or ambiguous decisions. In some jurisdictions, judicial decisions may determine whether the jurisdiction's constitution permits a particular statute or statutory provision, or what meaning is contained within the statutory provisions. The common law developed in England, influenced by Anglo-Saxon law and to a much lesser extent by the Norman conquest of England, which introduced legal concepts from Norman law, which, in turn, had its origins in Salic law. Common law was later inherited by the Commonwealth of Nations, and almost every former colony of the British Empire has adopted it (Malta being an exception). The doctrine of stare decisis, also known as case law or precedent by courts, is the major difference to codified civil law systems.

Common law is practised in Canada (excluding Quebec), Australia, New Zealand, most of the United Kingdom (England, Wales, and Northern Ireland), South Africa, Ireland, India (excluding Goa and Puducherry), Pakistan, Hong Kong, the United States (on state and territorial levels excluding Louisiana and Puerto Rico), Bangladesh, and many other places. Several others have adapted the common law system into a mixed system; For example, Nigeria operates largely on a common law system in the southern states and at the federal level, but also incorporates religious law in the northern states.

In the European Union, the Court of Justice takes an approach that mixes civil law (based on the treaties) with an emphasis on case law. One of the most fundamental documents to shape common law is the English Magna Carta, which placed limits on the power of the English Kings. It served as a kind of medieval bill of rights for the aristocracy and the judiciary, who developed the law.

Country	Description
American Samoa	Based on law of the United States.
Antigua and Barbuda	Based on English common law.
Australia	Based on English common law.
(The Bahamas) Bahamas	Based on English common law.
Bangladesh	Based on English common law, with the Muslim family law heavily based on Islamic law (Sharia).
Barbados	Based on English common law.
Belize	Based on English common law.
Bhutan	Based on English common law, with an Indian influence. Religious law influences personal law.
British Virgin Islands	Based on English common law.
Canada	Based on English common law, except in Quebec, where a civil law system based on French law prevails in most matters of a civil nature, such as obligations (contract and delict), property law, family law, and private matters. Federal statutes take into account Canada's juridical nature and use both common law and civil law terms where appropriate.
Cayman Islands	Based on English common law.
Cyprus	Based on English common law, as inherited from British colonization, with civil law influences, particularly in administrative law.
Dominica	Based on English common law.
England and Wales	Primarily common law, with early Roman and some modern continental European influences.
Fiji	Based on English common law.
Gibraltar	Based on English common law.
Ghana	Based on English common law.
Grenada	Based on English common law.
Hong Kong (P.R.China)	Principally based on English common law, also influenced by PRC law.
India	Based on English common law, except intermingled laws in Goa, Dadra and Nagar Haveli and Daman and Diu, and Puducherry. Vedic Hindu legal traditions also influenced the legal system in India.
(Republic of Ireland) Ireland	Based on Irish law before 1922, which was itself based on English common law.
Israel	Based on English common law, arising from the period of the British Mandate (which includes laws arising from previous Ottoman rule), also incorporating civil law and fragments of Halakha, Sharia, and Canon law for family law cases
Jamaica	Based on English common law.
Kiribati	Based on English common law.
Liberia	Based on Anglo-American and customary law
Marshall Islands	Based on law of the United States.
Myanmar	Based on English common law.
Nauru	Based on English common law.
Nepal	Based on English common law.
New Zealand	Based on English common law with some aspects of tikanga Māori.
Northern Ireland	Based on Irish law before 1921, in turn, based on English common law.
Palau	Based on law of the United States.
Pakistan	Based on English common law, with some provisions of Islamic law.
Papua New Guinea	Based on English common law and customary laws of its more than 750 different cultural and language groups.
Saint Kitts and Nevis	Based on English common law.
Saint Vincent and the Grenadines	Based on English common law.
Singapore	Based on English common law, but Muslims are subject to the Administration of Muslim Law Act, which gives the Sharia Court jurisdiction over Muslim personal law, e.g., marriage, inheritance, and divorce.
Tonga	Based on English common law.
Trinidad and Tobago	Based on English common law.
Tuvalu	Based on English common law.
Uganda	Based on English common law.
United States	Federal courts and 49 states use the legal system based on English common law, which has diverged somewhat since the mid-nineteenth century in that they look to each other's cases for guidance on issues of the first impression and rarely, if ever, look at contemporary cases on the same issue in the UK or the Commonwealth. Louisiana is based on French and Spanish civil law, and Puerto Rico is based on Spanish civil law.

== Religious law ==
Religious law refers to the use of a religious system or document as a legal source, though the methodology varies. For example, the use of Judaism and halakha for public law has a static and unalterable quality, precluding amendment through legislative acts of government or development through judicial precedent; Christian canon law is more similar to civil law in its use of codes; and Islamic sharia law (and fiqh jurisprudence) is based on legal precedent and reasoning by analogy (qiyas); it is thus considered similar to common law.

The main kinds of religious law are sharia in Islam, halakha in Judaism, and canon law in some Christian groups. In some cases, these are intended purely as individual moral guidance, whereas in others they may be used as the basis for a country's legal system; the latter was particularly common during the Middle Ages.

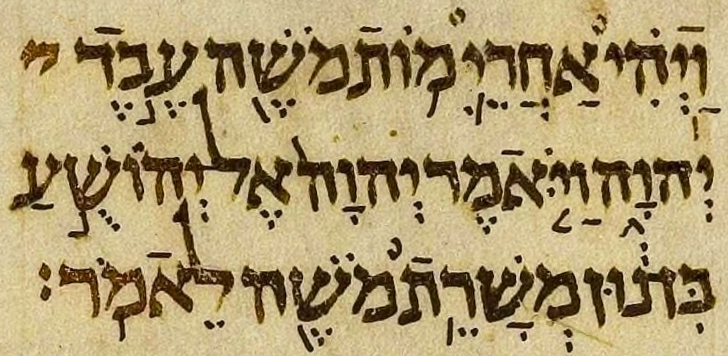
Aleppo Codex: 10th century Hebrew Bible with Masoretic pointing

Halakha is followed by Orthodox and Conservative Jews in both ecclesiastical and civil relations. No country is fully governed by halakha, but two Jewish people may decide, because of personal belief, to have a dispute heard by a Jewish court and be bound by its rulings.

Canon law is the internal ecclesiastical law, or operational policy, governing the Catholic Church (both the Latin Church and the Eastern Catholic Churches), the Eastern Orthodox and Oriental Orthodox churches, and the individual national churches within the Anglican Communion. Canon law of the Catholic Church (Latin: jus canonicum) is the system of laws and legal principles made and enforced by the hierarchical authorities of the Catholic Church to regulate its external organisation and government and to order and direct the activities of Catholics toward the mission of the church. The canon law of the Catholic Church has all the ordinary elements of a mature legal system: laws, courts, lawyers, judges. The canon law of the Latin Church was the first modern Western legal system, and is the oldest continuously functioning legal system in the West. while the distinctive traditions of Eastern Catholic canon law govern the 23 Eastern Catholic particular churches sui iuris.

The Islamic legal system, consisting of sharia (Islamic law) and fiqh (Islamic jurisprudence), is the most widely used religious law system, and one of the three most common legal systems in the world alongside common law and civil law. It is based on both divine law, derived from the hadith of the Quran and Sunnah, and the rulings of ulema (jurists), who use the methods of ijma (consensus), qiyas (analogical deduction), ijtihad (research), and urf (common practice) to derive fatwā (legal opinions). An ulema was required to qualify for an ijazah (legal doctorate) at a madrasa (law school or college) before they could issue fatwā. During the Islamic Golden Age, classical Islamic law may have had an influence on the development of common law and several civil law institutions. Sharia law governs many Islamic countries, including Saudi Arabia and Iran, though most countries use Sharia law only as a supplement to national law. It can relate to all aspects of civil law, including property rights, contracts, and public law.

Country	Description
Afghanistan	Islamic law, based on Sunni Hanafi jurisprudence.
Iran	Islamic law, based on Shia Jaʽfari jurisprudence.
Saudi Arabia	Islamic law, based on Sunni Hanbali jurisprudence.
Yemen	Islamic law.

== Pluralistic systems ==
=== Civil law and canon law ===
Canon law is not divine law, properly speaking, because it is not found in revelation. Instead, it is seen as human law inspired by the word of God and applying the demands of that revelation to the actual situation of the church. Canon law regulates the internal ordering of the Catholic Church, the Eastern Orthodox Church and the Anglican Communion. Canon law is amended and adopted by the legislative authority of the church, such as councils of bishops, individual bishops for their respective sees, the Pope for the entire Catholic Church, and the Parliament of the United Kingdom and General Synod of the Church of England for the Church of England.

Country	Description
Vatican City	Based on Roman and Italian civil law and Catholic canon law

=== Civil law and common law ===
Country	Description
Botswana	Based on South African law. An 1891 proclamation by the High Commissioner for Southern Africa applied the law of the Cape Colony (now part of South Africa) to the Bechuanaland Protectorate (now Botswana).
Cameroon	Mixture of French civil law system and English common law (After World War I, Cameroon was ruled by France and the United Kingdom as a League of Nations mandate, then a United Nations trust territory from 1916 to 1961)
Cyprus	Based on English common law (Cyprus was a British colony 1878–1960), with admixtures of French and Greek civil and public law, Italian civil law, Indian contract law, Greek Orthodox canon law, and Muslim religious law.
Eswatini	Based on South African law. A 1907 proclamation by the High Commissioner for Southern Africa applied the Roman-Dutch common law of the Transvaal Colony (now part of South Africa) to the Swaziland Protectorate (now Eswatini).
Guyana	Guyana follows a mixed legal system, combining civil law & common law.
India	In post-independence India, the Uniform Penal Code throughout India and civil code to residents of Goa. The Bharatiya Nyaya Sanhita, the Bharatiya Nagarik Suraksha Sanhita, and the Bharatiya Sakshya Act, 2023 amendment bills with minor changes. While Hindu personal law based on customary laws of Indian religions and Muslim personal law based on hanafi school are currently used, the Indian government is promoting a Uniform Civil Code that applies to all citizens.
Kenya	Based on English Common Law and Civil law, as well as the country's customary law.
Lesotho	Based on South African law. An 1884 proclamation by the High Commissioner for Southern Africa applied the law of the Cape Colony (now part of South Africa) to Basutoland (now Lesotho).
Louisiana ( (United States) U.S.)	Based on French and Spanish civil law, but federal laws (based on common law) are also in effect in Louisiana because of the federal constitution's Supremacy Clause. However, Louisiana's criminal, procedural, and administrative laws are predominantly based on the common law tradition.
Malta	Initially based on Roman Law and eventually progressing to the Code de Rohan, the Napoleonic Code with influences from Italian Civil Law. English common law, however, is also a source of Maltese Law, most notably in public law.
Mauritius	Laws governing the Mauritian penal system are derived partly from French civil law and British common law.
Namibia	Based on South African law. South Africa conquered South-West Africa (now Namibia) in 1915, and a 1919 proclamation by the Governor-General applied the law of the Cape Province of South Africa to the territory.
Philippines	Based on Spanish law; influenced by U.S. common law after 1898 Spanish– and Philippine–American Wars, personal law based on sharia law applies to Muslims.
Puerto Rico ( (United States) U.S.)	Based on Spanish law; influenced by U.S. common law after 1898 (victory of the U.S. over Spain in the Spanish–American War of 1898 and cession of Puerto Rico to the U.S.); federal laws (based on common law) are in effect because of the federal Supremacy Clause and Property Clause.
Quebec ( Canada)	After the 1763 Treaty of Paris awarded French Canada to Great Britain, the British initially attempted to impose English Common Law. In 1774, as a result of a ruling by the British courts in Campbell v Hall about the status of legal systems found in acquired territories, the British Parliament passed the Quebec Act, which preserved French civil law for private law while keeping and reserving English common law for public law including criminal prosecution. Codification occurred in 1866 with the enactment of the Civil Code of Lower Canada (French: Code civil du Bas-Canada), which continued in force when the modern Province of Quebec was created at Confederation in 1867. Subsequently, the Civil Code of Quebec (French: Code civil du Québec) came into effect on 1 January 1994, and is the civil code currently in force. Canadian (federal) criminal law in force in Quebec is based on common law. Still, federal statutes on or relating to private law take into account Canada's bi-juridical nature and use both common law and civil law terms where appropriate.
Saint Lucia	
Scotland	Based on Roman and continental law, with common law elements dating back to the High Middle Ages.
Seychelles	The substantive civil law is based on the French Civil Code. Otherwise, the criminal law and court procedure are based on the English common law.
South Africa	An amalgam of Roman-Dutch civil law and English common law, as well as Customary Law.
Sri Lanka	An amalgam of English common law, Roman-Dutch civil law and Customary Law
Thailand	The Thai legal system became an amalgam of German, Swiss, French, English, Japanese, Italian, Indian, and American laws and practices. Even today, Islamic laws and practices exist in four southern provinces. Over the years, Thai law has naturally taken on its own Thai identity.
Vanuatu	Consists of a mixed system combining the legacy of English common law, French civil law, and indigenous customary law.
Zimbabwe	Based on South African law. An 1891 proclamation by the High Commissioner for Southern Africa applied the law of the Cape Colony (now part of South Africa) to Southern Rhodesia (now Zimbabwe).

=== Civil law and sharia law ===
Country	Description
Algeria	
Bahrain	
Comoros	
Djibouti	
Egypt	Family Law (personal Statute) for Muslims based on Islamic Jurisprudence, Separate Personal Statute for non-Muslims, and all other branches of Law are based on the French civil law system
Eritrea	Only applies to Muslims for personal matters
Indonesia	Based on Napoleonic-Dutch civil law, mixed with Islamic sharia law (personal matters only), and Customary Law.
Jordan	Mainly based on French Civil Code and Ottoman Majalla, Islamic law applicable to family law
Mauritania	A mix of Islamic law and the French Civil Code, Islamic law is largely applicable to criminal and family law, as well as other forms of personal law, such as disputes.
Mauritius	Civil law and Sharia personal law for Muslims.
Morocco	Based on Islamic law and the French and Spanish civil law systems. Islamic law primarily governs personal matters, and Jews follow Halakha.
Oman	
Qatar	Based on Islamic law and the Egyptian civil law system (after the French civil law system)
Syria	Mainly based on French Civil Code. Islamic law applies to family law. Non-Muslims follow their own family laws.
United Arab Emirates	Mixed legal system, based on Islamic law and the Egyptian civil law system (after the French civil law system). The UAE adopts a dual legal system of civil and Sharia.

=== Common law and sharia law ===
Country	Description
Bangladesh	Under English common law, personal law based on Sharia applies to Muslims.
Brunei	
The Gambia	
Malaysia	Based on English common law, personal law based on sharia law applies to Muslims (Not used on non-Muslims).
Nigeria	Common law is used at the federal level and in most states, Sharia is applied in some northern states.
Pakistan	Based on English common law, some Islamic law (sharia) applications in inheritance. Formerly Tribal Law in the FATA.

== By geography ==
Despite the usefulness of different classifications, every legal system has its own individual identity. Below are groups of legal systems, categorised by their geographic location.

== See also ==
- Anarchist law
- Comparative law
- English common law
- Indigenous law
- International customary law
- Qanun (law)
- Legal pluralism
  - Journal of Legal Pluralism
- Rule of law
- Rule According to Higher Law
- Socialist law
- Soviet law
- Tribal law
- Western law
- Comparative law wiki
- Legal education

== Sources ==
Books

- Susan Farran, Esin Örücü, & Seán Patrick Donlan, eds. A study of mixed legal systems: endangered, entrenched, or blended. Farnham, Surrey: Ashgate, 2014.
- Elina N. Moustaira. Comparative law: university courses (in Greek). Athens: Ant. N. Sakkoulas Publishers, 2004, ISBN 960-15-1267-5.
- Elina N. Moustaira. Milestones in the course of comparative law: thesis and antithesis (in Greek). Athens: Ant. N. Sakkoulas Publishers, 2003, ISBN 960-15-1097-4.
- Esin Örücü, ed. Mixed legal systems at new frontiers. London: Wildy, Simmonds & Hill, 2010.
- Vernon Valentine Palmer, Mohamed Y. Mattar, & Anna Kopper, eds. Mixed legal systems, east and west. Farnham–Burlington, VT: Ashgate, 2014.
