= Law in North America =

The law of North America is diverse and influential. The law of the United States has worldwide renown, in its codified constitution, and bill of rights, while the law of Cuba differs vastly in its regulation of private property. The first court of justice was established in Newfoundland and Labrador, Canada in 1615 by Sir Richard Whitbourne as a court of admiralty at the future site of Trinity, Newfoundland and Labrador.

== List of countries ==
- Law of Antigua and Barbuda
- Law of Bahamas
- Law of Barbados
- Law of Belize
- Law of Canada
- Law of Costa Rica
- Law of Cuba
- Law of Dominica
- Law of Dominican Republic
- Law of El Salvador
- Law of Grenada
- Law of Guatemala
- Law of Haiti
- Law of Honduras
- Law of Jamaica
- Law of Mexico
- Law of Nicaragua
- Law of Panama
- Law of Saint Kitts and Nevis
- Law of Saint Lucia
- Law of Saint Vincent and the Grenadines
- Law of Trinidad and Tobago
- Law of the United States

== List of dependencies and territories ==
- Law of Anguilla
- Law of Aruba
- Law of Bermuda
- Law of the British Virgin Islands
- Law of Cayman Islands
- Law of Greenland
- Law of Guadeloupe
- Law of Martinique
- Law of Montserrat
- Law of Navassa Island
- Law of Netherlands Antilles
- Law of Puerto Rico
- Law of Saint-Pierre and Miquelon
- Law of Turks and Caicos Islands
- Law of U.S. Virgin Islands

== See also ==
- Legal systems of the world
