= Pensions in Slovakia =

Part of the Slovak social system

Pensions in Slovakia encompass old-age pensions as part of the Slovak social system. The Slovak pension system comprises three independent components, often referred to as the 'three pillars':

- Pension Insurance (1st Pillar): Administered by the Social Insurance Agency (Slovak: Sociálna poisťovňa).
- Old-Age Pension Scheme (2nd Pillar): Operates as a funded defined contribution scheme, with pension savings managed by pension fund management companies (PFMCs).
- Voluntary Supplementary Pension Scheme (3rd Pillar): Consists of two components.
  - Supplementary Pension Scheme (3rd Pillar): A defined contribution scheme funded by contributions from participants and their employers, managed by supplementary pension companies.
  - Pan-European Personal Pension Product (PEPP): An EU-wide personal pension scheme that provides all EU citizens with an additional option for retirement savings.

== History ==
The three-pillar system was established following an extensive pension scheme reform introduced in 2003.

== Pension insurance (1st pillar) ==
The pension insurance system, known as the "1st pillar," is a defined-benefit system funded on a pay-as-you-go (PAYGO) basis. The essence of the 1st pillar is its close connection to citizens' economic activity and income.

The positive correlation between contributions made to the system and the benefits received reflects the merit principle of this system—the benefits an insured person is entitled to depend on the insurance premiums they have paid, which are the primary source of funding for the pension insurance system.

Pension insurance consists of two independent, separately financed subsystems, managed by the Social Insurance Agency:

- Old-age Pension Insurance: Provides a steady stream of income during retirement and in the event of the insured person's death.
- Disability Insurance: Offers income support in cases where the insured experiences a long-term decline in earning ability due to adverse health conditions or in the event of death.

Pension insurance is mandatory, with participation in the system required by law for eligible individuals. However, the law also permits voluntary pension insurance.

== Old-age pension scheme (2nd pillar) ==
The old-age pension scheme, known as the "2nd pillar," is a defined-contribution system financed through capitalization. It is administered by pension fund management companies (PFMCs) (Slovak: dôchodkové správcovské spoločnosti, DSS).

The old-age pension scheme, together with pension insurance (1st pillar), forms the core system of pension security. Together, they ensure a steady income stream for the beneficiary after reaching retirement age and for their family in the event of the beneficiary's death.

Upon entering the 2nd pillar, the mandatory pension insurance contributions, which total 18%, are split into two parts as prescribed by law.

Beneficiaries, therefore, receive their pension from two sources: the first being a reduced pension from the 1st pillar, paid by the Social Insurance Agency, and the second being a pension from the 2nd pillar. The amount of the 2nd pillar pension depends on the extent of contribution payments, their appreciation, and the selected method of drawing the pension from the old-age pension scheme.

The old-age pension scheme consists of two main phases:

- The Saving Phase: A portion of the mandatory contributions from the saver is transferred to their personal pension account, managed by the pension fund management company (PFMC) of their choice. During this phase, savers can freely select not only the PFMC but also the pension funds in which they want their contributions to grow. The saver also has the option to transfer voluntary contributions to their old-age pension savings.
- The Payout Phase: In this phase, the old-age pension, or early old-age pension, is paid to the beneficiary from the appreciated contributions. In the event of the beneficiary's death, the survivors, if any, receive an inheritance pension. Depending on the chosen payout method from the 2nd pillar, the pension may be paid by either the insurance company or the PFMC.

According to the financial register of the National Bank of Slovakia (NBS), as of April 2024, five pension fund management companies operate in Slovakia: Allianz - Slovenská dôchodková správcovská spoločnosť, a.s.; KOOPERATIVA dôchodková správcovská spoločnosť, a.s. (abbreviated as KOOPERATIVA, d.s.s., a.s.); NN dôchodková správcovská spoločnosť, a.s.; UNIQA d.s.s., a.s.; and VÚB Generali dôchodková správcovská spoločnosť, a.s.

== Supplementary pension scheme (3rd pillar) ==
The supplementary pension scheme, known as the "3rd pillar," is a voluntary system in which the financial assets of participants are managed by supplementary pension companies.

The supplementary pension scheme is designed to provide participants with:

- Additional pension income in old age, and
- Additional pension income in the event of withdrawal from a high-risk occupation. The specific list of high-risk occupations is issued by the legally responsible state authorities. In addition to the official list, occupations such as dancers in companies and theaters—regardless of style or technique—and wind instrument players are also considered high-risk.

Entrance to the 3rd Pillar:

- Mandatory for employees in high-risk occupations: Employees with high-risk occupations are required to enter the 3rd pillar within 30 days of starting the occupation. This means the employee must sign a participation contract, and their employer must enter into an employer contract with the supplementary pension company (Slovak: Doplnková dôchodková spoločnosť, DDS) of the employee's choice within 30 days.
- Voluntary for other employees and citizens over 18: Participation is voluntary for employees in non-high-risk occupations and for citizens over 18. If an employee—or more precisely, a citizen over 18—chooses to participate in the 3rd pillar, they must sign a participation contract with a supplementary pension company. However, the employer is not required to enter into an employer contract with the respective supplementary pension company.

In the saving phase of the scheme, participants, or alternatively, their employers, pay contributions to the supplementary pension savings. Participants can invest these contributions into one or more funds offered by the chosen supplementary pension company. Transfers between funds within a single supplementary pension company are not subject to a charge.

- For employees with high-risk occupations who have entered into a participation contract, contributions are paid by their employers from the first day of employment. The employee may contribute as well during their employment, but is not required to do so.
- For employees in non-high-risk occupations, contributions are paid by the employees themselves. However, the employer can also make contributions if an employer contract has been signed.

In the payout phase, benefits are paid to the beneficiary after the saving period ends. The type of benefits paid depends on the timing of the participation contract and whether it includes a benefit plan.

According to the financial register of the National Bank of Slovakia (NBS), as of April 2024, four supplementary pension companies operate in Slovakia: Doplnková dôchodková spoločnosť Tatra banky, a.s.; NN Tatry - Sympatia, d.d.s., a.s.; STABILITA, d.d.s., a.s.; and UNIQA d.d.s., a.s.

== Pan-European personal pension product (PEPP) ==
The Pan-European Personal Pension Product (PEPP) is a transferable, voluntary, EU-wide personal investment product with a long-term pension focus that incorporates ESG factors in its investments. It is primarily aimed at young people and mobile workers within the EU.

According to the financial register of the National Bank of Slovakia (NBS), as of April 2024, there is one provider of the PEPP in Slovakia: Finax, o.c.p., a.s.
