= Judiciary of the Republic of Serbia =

The judiciary of Serbia (Serbian: правосуђе Србије, romanized: pravosuđe Srbije) is a branch of the government of Serbia that interprets and applies the laws of Serbia, to ensure equal justice under law, and to provide a mechanism for dispute resolution. The legal system of Serbia is a civil law system, historically influenced by Germanic and, to a lesser degree, French law, as well as Yugoslav law, but in the process of the accession of Serbia to the European Union, the legal system is being completely harmonised with European Union law. The Constitution of Serbia provides for an independent judiciary, led by the Supreme Court. The Ministry of Justice handles the administration of judiciary, including paying salaries and constructing new courthouses, as well as administering the prison system.

== Judicial Organization ==
The judiciary of Serbia is a three-tiered system of courts with the Supreme Court (Serbian: Врховни суд, romanized: Vrhovni sud) standing at the highest tier. The Supreme Court is the highest court of appeal and court of cassation for both types of jurisdiction that exist (courts of general jurisdiction and courts of special jurisdiction).

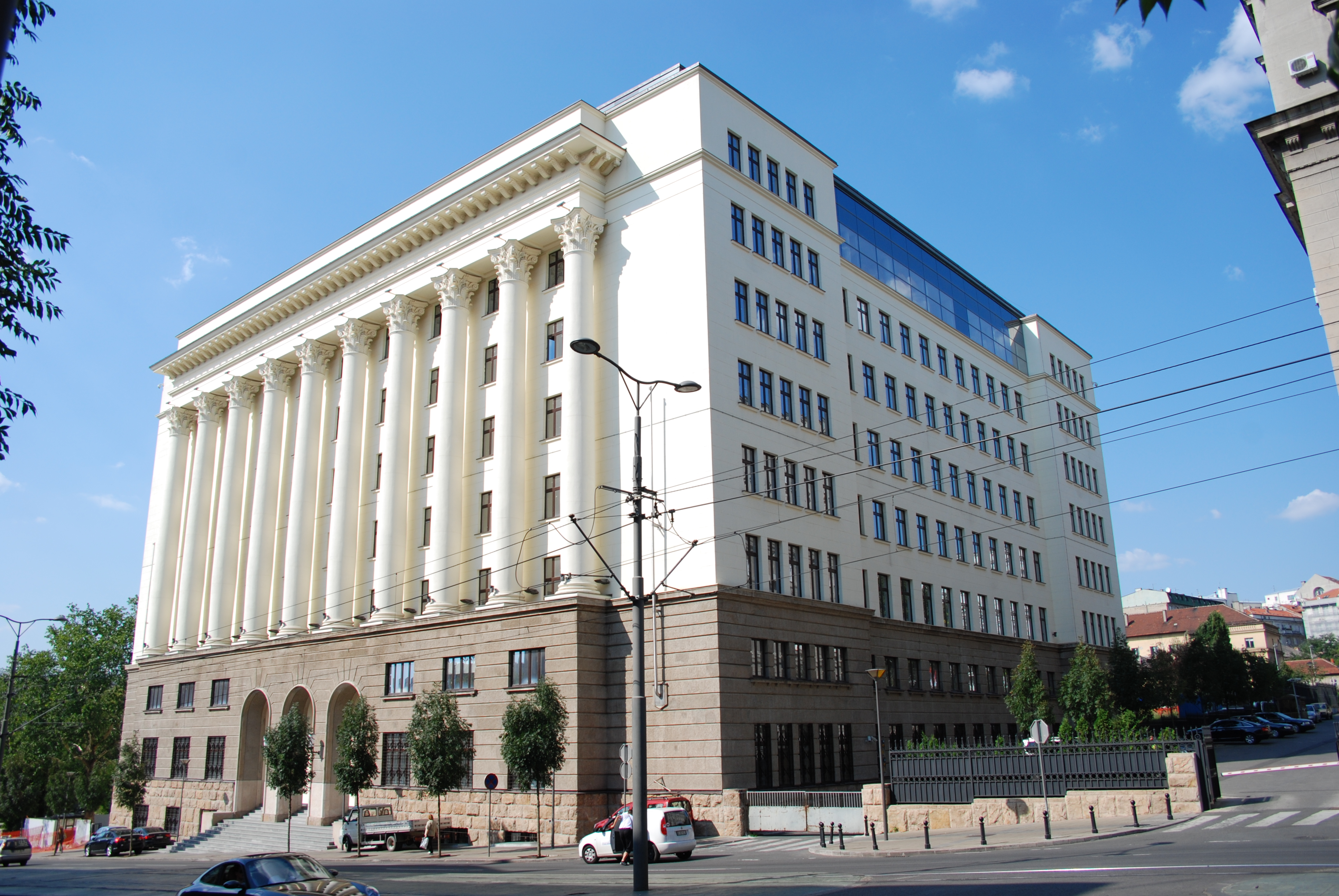
Supreme Court Building

There are two different jurisdictions:

- courts of general jurisdiction (sudovi opšte nadležnosti)
- courts of special jurisdiction (sudovi posebne nadležnosti)

=== Courts of General Jurisdiction ===
If a matter is not assigned to courts of special jurisdiction specifically (by legislation), it is to be dealt with by the courts of general jurisdiction. There are two tiers of courts of general jurisdiction:

- 66 basic courts (osnovni sudovi) as first instance in civil (including family and labour) lawsuits and for minor criminal offences; and 25 high courts (Serbian: виши судови, romanized: viši sudovi) as first instance of original jurisdiction and first instance for serious criminal offences (felonies). Basic courts are established for the territory of several municipalities and cities, while high courts are generally established for the territory of an administrative district.
- 4 courts of appeal (apelacioni sudovi) as courts of second instance, for decisions of basic and high courts.

=== Courts of Special Jurisdiction ===
There are three types of courts of special jurisdiction: misdemeanor courts, commercial courts and administrative court.

- Misdemeanor jurisdiction has two tiers: the lower one consists of 44 misdemeanour courts (prekršajni sudovi) which act as courts of first instance for misdeamanors and are established for the territory of several municipalities and cities; and the Misdemeanor Court of Appeal (Serbian: Прекршајни апелациони суд, romanized: Prekršajni apelacioni sud) as the court of second instance.
- Commercial judiciary has jurisdiction over commercial law and has two tiers: the lower one consists of 16 commercial courts (privredni sudovi) as courts of first instance and are established for the territory of several municipalities and cities; and the Commercial Court of Appeal (Serbian: Привредни апелациони суд, romanized: Privredni apelacioni sud) as the court of second instance.
- Administrative judiciary competence falls within the administrative law, including cases relating to actions for competence issues between government bodies, elections, registration of political parties. There is one Administrative Court (Serbian: Управни суд, romanized: Upravni sud) for the whole of territory of Serbia.

== Judicial Actors ==
The most important actors in all proceedings are professional judges and advocates, while in criminal trials also public prosecutors.

=== Judge ===
The judges (sudije) are indeed the central figure of the Serbian judiciary, as only his/her position is defined by the Constitution itself. There is no such thing as jury in Serbian courts and the judge himself (or a panel of judges) decides both the verdict and the sentence.

Serbia has a system of career judiciary. The law requires a judge to be a graduate of a law school, a person with full integrity (no criminal record) and states the position is incompatible with political functions. Judges are appointed for life by the High Magistrate Council and cannot normally be recalled.

The High Magistrate Council (Serbian: Високи савет судства, romanized: Visoki savet sudstva) consists of eleven members, specifically six judges, nominated and elected by judges of the courts of all instances; four "distinguished lawyers", and the president of the Supreme Court, for five-year terms (with the exception of the president of the Supreme Court). It appoints all judges and court presidents and decides on disciplinary proceedings concerning all judges.

=== Public prosecutor ===
The public prosecutors (javni tužioci) and deputy public prosecutors (zamenici javnog tužioca) are entitled of bringing a criminal procedure action. They all form the public prosecutor office (javno tužilaštvo) which represents the state in criminal procedures. The office is led by the Supreme Public Prosecution Office (Serbian: Врховно јавно тужилаштво, romanized: Vrhovno javno tužilaštvo), and assisted by lower-ranking appellate public prosecution offices (аpelaciona javna tužilaštva), high public prosecution offices (visoka javna tužilaštva), and basic public prosecution offices (osnovna javna tužilaštva). There are also three specialized public prosecutors offices: Public Prosecutors Office for the Organized Crime (Serbian: Тужилаштво за организовани криминал, romanized: Tužilaštvo za oragnizovani kriminal), Public Prosecutors Office for the War Crimes (Serbian: Тужилаштво за ратне злочине, romanized: Tužilaštvo za ratne zločine), and Public Prosecutors Office for the High Technological Crime (Serbian: Тужилаштво за високотехнолошки криминал, romanized: Tužilaštvo za visokotehnološki kriminal).

The public prosecutors and deputy public prosecutors are appointed for a four-year term by the High Prosecutorial Council (Serbian: Високи савет тужилаштва, romanized: Visoki savet tužilaštva). It consists of eleven members, specifically five public prosecutors/deputy public prosecutors, nominated and elected by public prosecutors/deputy public prosecutors of the public prosecutors offices of all instances; four "distinguished lawyers", the Supreme Public Prosecutor and the Minister of Justice, for five-year terms (with the exception of the Supreme Public Prosecutor and the Minister of Justice). It appoints all judges and court presidents and decides on disciplinary proceedings concerning all judges.

=== Advocate ===
The advocates (advokati) are all legally educated persons providing legal representation in court as well as giving legal advice. To be allowed to legally practise law in Serbia, an advocate must first obtain a master's degree from a faculty of law, a prospective advocate must complete 3 years of professional training crowned by passing the bar examination. He/she must then become a member of the Bar Association of Serbia (Serbian: Адвокатска комора Србије, romanized: Advokatska komora Srbije).

=== Other ===
Other legal professions exist, not directly involved in court proceedings – notaries (javni beležnici) and bailiffs (javni izvršitelji).

== Law ==
The Serbia has a legal system of the continental type, rooted in Germanic legal culture. The main source of law is written legislature. The form of court proceeding is prescribed in the laws of criminal, civil and administrative procedure, respectively. The legal force of different Serbian legal sources is hierarchical.

=== Procedure ===
Court proceedings are oral and public, with exceptions stated by law (juvenile justice). The procedure is based on inquisitorial system with features of the adversarial system. There is no jury.

For criminal procedure, the chief regulation is the Law of Criminal Procedure. It sets out the role of the bodies involved in criminal proceedings (namely the police, the public prosecutor, and the court) while preparing the prosecution, such as interviewing the witnesses and gathering evidence. It also sets out procedures for criminal charge, trial, and appeal process with separate procedure for minors.

The civil procedure, the chief regulation is the Law of Civil Procedure.

The administrative court procedure, regulated by the Law of Administrative Judicial Procedure deals with claims of natural and legal persons, who seek protection from illegal decisions or action of public authorities. While in many respects similar to civil procedure, the administrative judicial procedure is different in that the defendant here is not an entity of private law, but a state body. Not being a legal person, such a state body could not be sued otherwise.

== See also ==
- Supreme Court of Serbia
- Law of Serbia
