= Law of São Tomé and Príncipe =

The Law of São Tomé e Príncipe derives from Portuguese Civil law and is based on statutes. The Constitution of São Tomé and Príncipe, in force since 2003, is the supreme law of the country and is characterized by its rigid written form.

== Constitution and law ==
The law of São Tomé e Príncipe is largely derived from Portuguese civil law and is related to the Roman-Germanic legal tradition. This means that the legal system is based on statutes.

The Constitution of São Tomé e Príncipe, in force since 2003, is the supreme law of the country and is characterized by its rigid written form. It has 160 articles about organization of political powers, Human rights, social and economic issues.

== Judiciary Branch ==
The "Supremo Tribunal de Justiça (STJ)" and the "Tribunal Constitucional" are the highest courts of the country.

== See also ==
- Legal systems of the world
