= Law of Latvia =

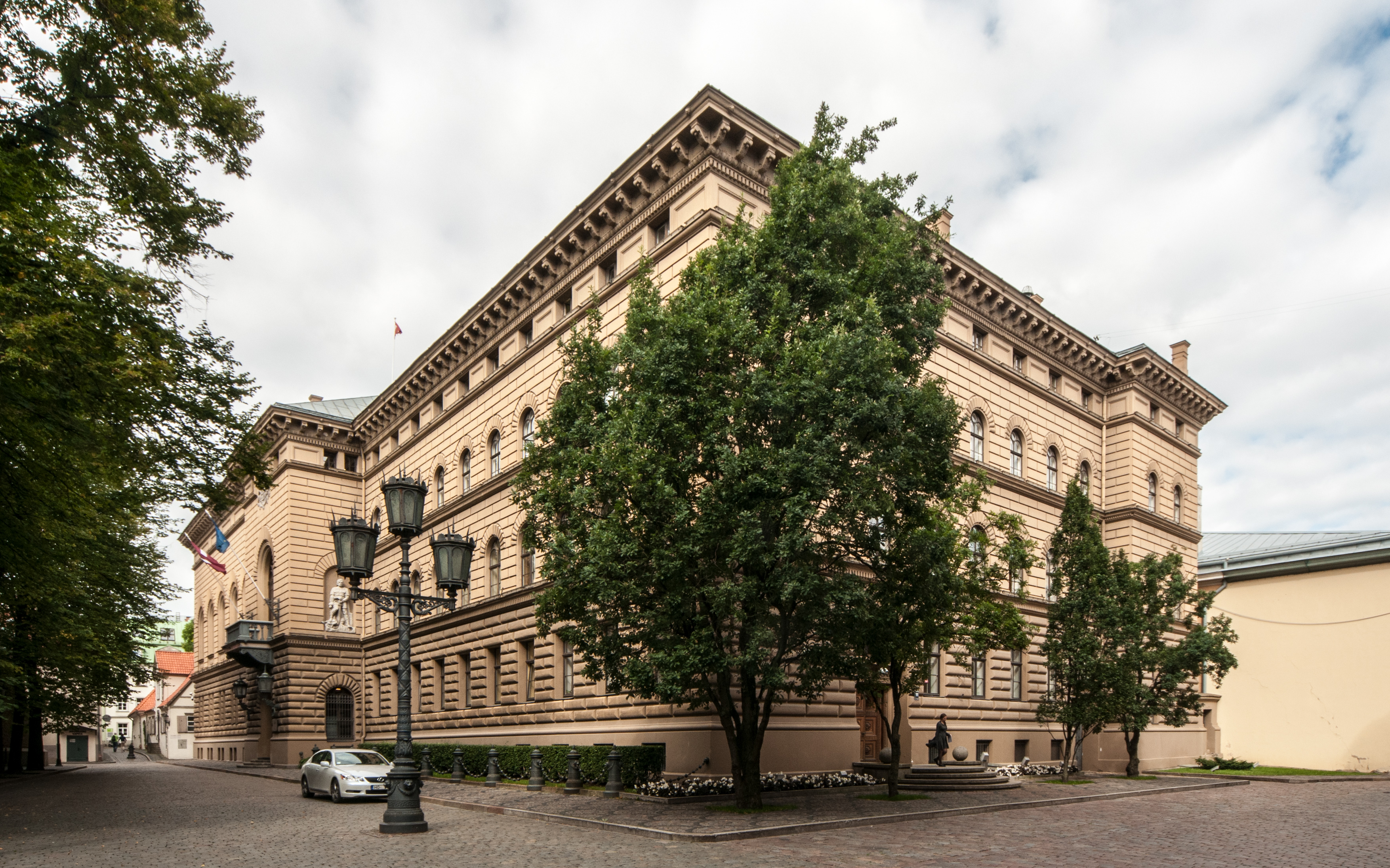
Saeima, parliament of Latvia

Latvian law is a part of the legal system of Latvia. It is largely civil, as opposed to a common, law system with traces of socialist traditions and practices. It is based on epitomes in the German and French systems. The Latvian legal system is grounded on the principles laid out in the Constitution of the Republic of Latvia and safeguarded by the Constitutional Court of the Republic of Latvia.

== History ==
During the Soviet occupation, the law of the USSR was in force in Latvia.

The European Union law is an integral part of the Latvian legal system since 1 May 2004.

== See also ==
- Declaration On the Restoration of Independence of the Republic of Latvia
- Legal systems of the world
