= Aboriginal law =

Aboriginal law or tribal law may refer to:

- Canadian Aboriginal law
- Aboriginal title in the United States
- Tribal sovereignty in the United States
- Customary law

== See also ==
- Indigenous law
