= Legal institutions of Scotland in the High Middle Ages =

Scottish legal institutions in the High Middle Ages are, for the purposes of this article, the informal and formal systems which governed and helped to manage Scottish society between the years 900 and 1288, a period roughly corresponding with the general European era usually called the High Middle Ages. Scottish society in this period was predominantly Gaelic. Early Gaelic law tracts, first written down in the ninth century reveal a society highly concerned with kinship, status, honour and the regulation of blood feuds. The early Scottish lawman, or Breitheamh, became the Latin Judex; the great Breitheamh became the magnus Judex, which arguably developed into the office of Justiciar, an office which survives to this day in that of Lord Justice General. Scottish common law began to take shape at the end of the period, assimilating Gaelic and Celtic law with practices from Anglo-Norman England and the Continent.

== Native Law ==
Pre-fourteenth century law amongst the native Scots is not always well attested. There does not survive a vast corpus of native law from Scotland particularly, certainly nothing like that which comes from early medieval Ireland. However, the latter gives some basis for reconstructing pre-fourteenth century Scottish law. King Robert Bruce cites common "customs", as well as language, as features which made the Scots and Irish one people. In the earliest extant Scottish legal manuscript, there is a document called Leges inter Brettos et Scottos. The document is in French, and is almost certainly a French translation of an earlier Gaelic document. The sentence ...

"Le cro et le galnys et le enauch unius cuiusque hominis sunt pares scillicet in respectu de le enauch feminarum suarum"

... contains two Gaelic terms, and one term of Welsh origin which the French translator left alone. Cro, represents the Old Irish word cró, which means homicide, or compensation for homicide (galnys, from Old Welsh galanas, means exactly the same thing in Cumbric). Enauch corresponds to Old Irish enech, which meant "face" (C/F, lóg n-enech meant honour price). The text contains many other Gaelic terms.

Later medieval legal documents, written both in Latin and Middle English, contain more Gaelic legal terms, examples including slains (Old Irish slán or sláinte; exemption), cumherba (Old Irish comarba; ecclesiastic heir), makhelve (Old Irish mac-shleabh; money given to a foster-child), scoloc (Old Irish scolóc; a low ranking ecclesiastical tenant), phili (Old Irish fili; high ranking poet), colpindach (Old Irish colpthach; a two-year-old heifer), kuneveth (Old Irish coinnmed; hospitality payment), tocher (Old Irish tochrae; dowry) and culrath (Old Irish cúlráth; surety, pledge).

Additionally, we know a great deal about early Gaelic law, often called Brehon Laws, which helps reconstruct native legal practices. In the twelfth century, and certainly in the thirteenth, strong continental legal influences began to have more effect, such as Canon law and various Anglo-Norman practices.

== Judex ==
A Judex (pl. judices), is what was known in medieval Gaelic as Brithem or Breitheamh, and later becoming known in English as doomster. The institution is so Gaelic in nature that it is rarely translated by scholars. It probably represents a post-Norman continuity with the ancient Gaelic orders of lawmen called in English today Brehons. However, in rare cases, the term was also used for similar Anglo-Saxon officials in the English-speaking lands of the Scottish king. Bearers of the office almost always have Gaelic names north of the Forth or in the south-west; continental names are rare. Judices were often royal officials who supervised baronial, abbatial and other lower-ranking "courts". They seem to have been officials who, at least in the thirteenth century, were designated by province, for example, we have one styled Bozli judice Mernis (i.e. "Bozli, Brehon of The Mearns"). There also existed an official called the judex regis (i.e. "King's Brehon"), and perhaps this status was a way of ranking various orders of Gaelic lawmen.

== Justiciar ==
However, the main official of law in the post-Davidian Kingdom of the Scots was the Justiciar. The institution has some Anglo-Norman origins, but in Scotland north of the Forth it represented some form of continuity with an older office. For instance, Mormaer Causantín of Fife is styled judex magnus (i.e. great Brehon), and it seems that the Justiciarship of Scotia was just a further Latinisation/Normanisation of that position. By the middle of the thirteenth century, responsibility of the Justiciar became fully formalized. He supervised the activity and behaviour of royal sheriffs and sergeants, held courts and reported on these things to the king personally.

Normally, there were two Justiciarships, organized by linguistic boundaries: the Justiciar of Scotia and the Justiciar of Lothian. Sometimes there was also a Justiciar of Galloway. The Justiciarship of Lothian dates to somewhere in the reign of Máel Coluim IV. As English expanded westwards in the thirteenth century and after, Lothian came to include not only the core south-east, but also subordinated the sheriffs of Stirling, Lanark, Dumbarton and even Ayr. When Edward I of England conquered Scotland, he divided it into four justiciarships of two justiciars each: Scotia north of the Grampians; Scotia south of the Grampians; Lothian; and Galloway.

== Notes ==
1. , D.H.S. Sellar, "Gaelic Laws and Institutions", (2001), pp. 381–2
2. , MacQueen, "Laws and Languages", (2002).
3. , Kelly, Early Irish Law, esp. pp. 324–5.
4. , Barrow, Kingdom of the Scots, (2003), pp. 69–82.
5. , See Barrow, "Justiciar", ibid., pp. 68–109.
