= History of Indian law =

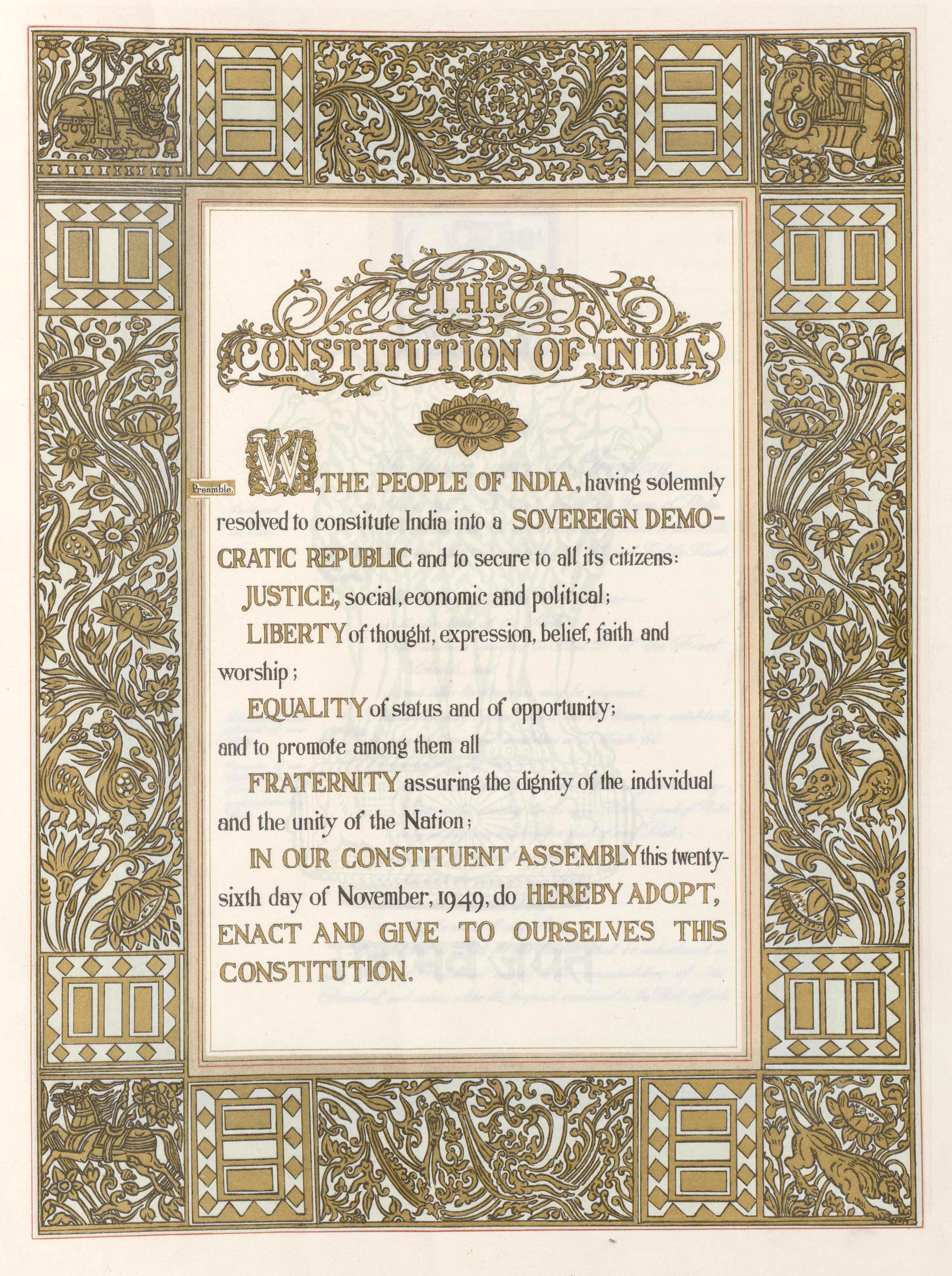
The Constitution of India is the longest written constitution for a country, containing 395 articles, 12 schedules, 105 amendments and 117,369 words.

Law in India primarily evolved from customary practices and religious prescriptions in the Indian subcontinent, to the modern well-codified acts and laws based on a constitution in the Republic of India. The various stages of evolution of Indian law is classified as that during the Vedic period, the Islamic period, the British period and post independence.

== Vedic period ==
In comparison with modern law, the classical Hindu law was a peculiar legal system as it followed a unique arrangement of law and polity with a unique scheme of values. Ancient India represented a distinct tradition of law, and had a historically independent school of legal theory and practice. The main aim of the law in the Vedic period was to preserve "dharma" which means righteousness and duty. Dharma consists of both legal duties and religious duties. It not only includes laws and court procedures, but also a wide range of human activities like ritual purification, personal hygiene regimes, and modes of dress. Dharma provided the principal guidance by which one endeavored to lead his life.

=== Sources of classical Hindu law ===
The sources of law during this period were Sruti, Smriti and acharas (customs). Sruti consist of the 4 Vedas namely Rigveda, Yajurveda, Samaveda and Atharvaveda. These Vedas chiefly dealt with religious duties, practices and customs. The second source is called Smriti, which literally means 'as remembered' and refers to tradition. They are the humanly authored written texts that contain the collected traditions.

Some of the most prominent Smriti are Dharmashastras which includes Manusmriti (200BC-200CE); Yajnavalkya Smriti (200-500CE); Naradasmriti (100BC-400CE); Visnusmriti (700-1000CE); Brhaspatismriti (200-400CE); and Katyayanasmriti (300-600CE). These texts were often used for legal judgments and opinion. They dealt with the subject matter of dharma and were guidebooks on dharma with rules of conduct and rites. Dharmasutra (the first four texts of the Dharmashastra) discuss the rules for duties for all the ashrama: the student-hood, the house holdership, the retirement or forest dwelling, and renunciation. Also, they provide the rites and duties of kings and court proceedings. Other issues that are Dharmasutras cover include rules about one's diet, crimes and punishments, daily sacrifices, and funeral practices.

Dharmashastra contains three categories or topics. The first is the âchâra, which provides rules on daily rituals, life-cycle rites, as well as specific duties and proper conduct that each of the four castes or varnas have to follow. The daily rituals include practices about daily sacrifices, the kind of food to eat and how to obtain them, and who can give and who can accept religious gifts. The life-cycle rites are the rituals that are conducted on important events in one's life like birth, marriage, and tying of the sacred thread. Acharas also provide rules for duties for all the ashrama. Ashrama are the four stages of life that include: Brahmacharya (the student life), Grihastha (the householder), Vanaprastha (the forest dweller), and Sanyasa (the renouncer). The second topic enumerated in the Dharmashastra is the 'vyavâhara'. Vyavahara are laws and legal procedures. They include the'rajadharma' or the duties and obligations of a king to organize court, listen and examine witnesses, decide and enforce punishment and pursue justice. The third category is called the 'prâyaschitta', which lays down rules for punishments and penances for violating the laws of dharma. They are understood to remove the sin of committing something that is forbidden.

During the Vedic period the legal procedures including that of filing case were called vyavahara. The equivalent of modern plaint was called "purvapaksha", and that of written statement as "uttar". The trial was called "kriya" and verdict as "nirnaya". The profession of lawyers or advocates were unknown during this period. Trial by jury and trial by ordeal were the two types of trials that existed during the period. According to J. Rama Jois the ancient Indian and constitutional system had established a duty based society. It postulated that everybody from the king to the lowest of society is bound to fulfil his/her duty towards the society. This was same for the whole of India, notwithstanding the existence of larger and smaller kingdoms and the supremacy of Dharma (law) over the kings as declared in the authoritative texts was respected in letter and spirits/ Thus there were no absolute monarchies. The Dharmasastras asked the kings to look upon the people as God (Praja Vishnu) and serve them with love and reverence. The doctrine of "king can do no wrong" was not accepted and the king himself was subjected to law.

== Administration of Justice During Vedic Period ==
In ancient India, Naman was regarded as the fountain of justice has to act as the lord of Dharma and was entrusted with the supreme authority of the administration of justice and his foremost duty was to protect the rights of his subject. The King's Court was the highest court, next to which came the court of the Chief Justice (Pradvivaka). The King's Court was the highest court of appeal as well as an original court in cases of vital importance to the state. In the King's Court the King was advised by learned people like Learned Brahmins, the ministers, the Chief Justice etc. As mentioned by Brihaspati, there were four kinds of tribunals, namely, stationary, movable courts held under the royal signet in the absence of the King, and commissions under the King's presidency. So there was hierarchy of courts. In villages, the village councils (Kulani) dealt with simple civil and criminal cases. At a higher level in towns and districts the courts were presided over by government officers under the authority of the King to administer justice. In order to deal with problems among members of artisanal class, traders etc. trade guilds were authorised to exercise an effective jurisdiction over their members. Family courts were also established. Puga assemblies made up of groups of families in the same village decided civil disputes amongst family members. Minor criminal cases were dealt with by judicial assemblies in villages whereas criminal cases of a serious nature were presented before the central court usually held under the King or royal authority. The appeal system was practised and the King was the highest body of appeal. One significant feature of the ancient Indian legal system was the absence of lawyers. Another notable feature was that a bench of two or more judges was always preferred to administer justice rather than a single individual being the sole administrator of justice.

== 2nd Millennium ==
Sharia and Islamic economics fully spread in the Indian subcontinent with the establishment of Delhi Sultanate, Bengal Sultanate and Gujarat Sultanate.

In the 17th century, the Mughal Empire's sixth ruler, Aurangzeb, compiled the Fatawa-e-Alamgiri with several Arab and Iraqi Islamic scholars, which served as the main governing body in most parts of South Asia.

During the British Raj, the Anglo-Hindu law was introduced with the codification of Indian Law.

== See also ==
- Law of India
- Indian criminal law
