= Law of Serbia =

The Law of Serbia is the system of legal rules in force in Serbia, and in the international community it is a member of. Serbian legal system belongs mainly to the Germanic branch of continental legal culture (civil law). Major areas of public and private law are divided into branches, among them civil, criminal, administrative, family and labour law.

Serbia is the fourth modern-day European country, after France, Austria, and the Netherlands, to have a codified legal system.

Written law is the basis of the legal order, and the most important source of law are: Constitution of Serbia, legal regulations (acts of parliament), international treaties (once they have been ratified by the parliament and promulgated), and such findings of the Constitutional Court, in which a law or its part has been nullified as unconstitutional.

== Sources of law ==
Sources of Serbian law are (in this hierarchical order):

- the Constitution (Serbian: Устав, romanized: Ustav) and constitutional acts (Serbian: уставни закон, romanized: ustavni zakon)
- international treaties ratified by the National Assembly (Serbian: ратификовани међународни уговори, romanized: ratifikovani međunarodni ugovori)
- laws adopted by the National Assembly (Serbian: закони, romanized: zakoni)
- published decisions of the Constitutional Court (Serbian: одлуке Уставног суда, romanized: odluke Ustavnog suda)
- derived legislation: government decrees (Serbian: уредбе Владе, romanized: uredbe Vlade) and ministerial decisions (Serbian: одлуке министарстава, romanized: odluke ministarstava); legislative acts of territorial self-government bodies: provincial government decrees (Serbian: уредбе Покрајинске владе, romanized: uredbe Pokrajinske vlade) and city/municipal ordinances (Serbian: градске/општинске уредбе, romanized: gradske/opštinske uredbe)

Acts of parliament and other legal regulations enter into force on the day they are promulgated (published) in the "Official Gazette of the Republic of Serbia" (Serbian: Службени гласник Републике Србије, romanized: Službeni glasnik Republike Srbije), although they may take effect at a later date. International treaties are similarly published in the "Official Gazette of the Republic of Serbia".

== See also ==
- Constitution of Serbia
- Judiciary of Serbia
