= Law of Estonia =

According to the Constitution of Estonia (Estonian: Põhiseadus), the supreme power of the state is vested in the people. The people exercise their supreme power of the state on the elections of the Riigikogu through citizens who have the right to vote. The supreme judicial power is vested in the Supreme Court or Riigikohus, with 17 justices. The Chief Justice is appointed by the parliament for nine years on nomination by the president.

The official Head of State is the President of Estonia, who gives assent to the laws passed by Riigikogu, also having the right of sending them back and proposing new laws. The president, however, does not use these rights very often, having a largely ceremonial role. The president is elected by a two-thirds vote of the Riigikogu. If the candidate does not gain the number of votes required, the right to elect the president goes over to an electoral body, consisting of the 101 members of Riigikogu and representatives from local councils. As other spheres, Estonian law-making has been successfully integrated with the Information Age.
