= Law of Malta =

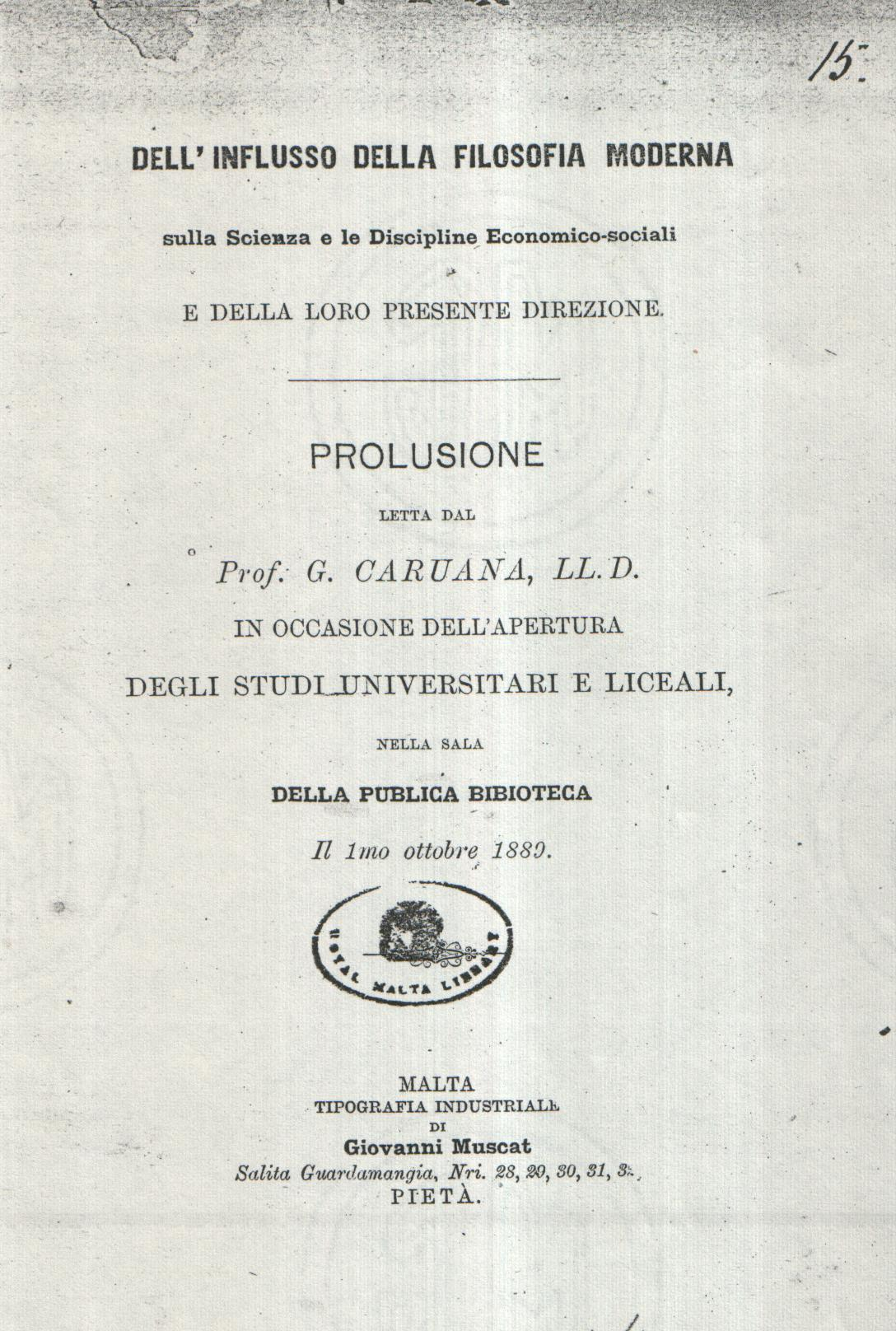

The law of Malta incorporates continental law, common law and local traditions, such as Code de Rohan. A municipal code was enacted in 1784 and replaced in 1813. Maltese law has evolved over the centuries and reflected the rule of the context of the time. At present Malta has a mixed-system codification, influenced by Roman law, French Napoleonic Code, English Common Law, European Union law, international law, and customary law established through local customs

== Constitution ==
The constitution of 1964 replaced that of 1961.

== Legislation ==
The legislature is the Parliament of Malta.

Legislation includes codes and Acts of Parliament. Legislation once included the bando and prammatica (or pragmatic).

== Cases and reports ==
Collections of law reports include:

- Repertorio de Decisioni. This volume of reports covers the period from 1713 to 1838.
- Collezione di decisioni dei tribunali. These four volumes of reports cover the period from 1839 to 1842.
- Decisione scelte della corti superiori. This volume of reports covers the period from 1847 to 1849.
- Collezione di decisioni dei tribunali superiori. These reports cover a period that begins in 1854.

== Courts and judiciary ==
There are Superior Courts, including the Court of Appeal, the Court of Criminal Appeal and the Constitutional Court. There was a Supreme Council of Justice. There is a Chief Justice of Malta.

== Legal practitioners ==
Practitioners include legal procurators and advocates.

== Criminal law ==
Legislation has included the Criminal Code of 1854 (c 9), the Criminal Code (Amendment) Act 1963, the Criminal Code (Amendment) (No. 2) Act 1963, the Criminal Code (Amendment) Act 1966 (No 43), the Criminal Code (Amendment) Act 1967 (No 2), the Criminal Code (Amendment) (No. 2) Act 1967 (No 25), the Criminal Code (Amendment) Act 1972 (No 33), the Criminal Code (Amendment) Act 1973 (No 2), the Criminal Code (Amendment) (No. 2) Act 1973 (No 3), the Criminal Code (Amendment) Act 1974 (No 4), and the Criminal Code (Amendment) (No. 2) Act 1974 (No 8).

== Bibliography ==
- David Joseph Attard. The Maltese Legal System. Second Edition. Malta University Press. 2013. ISBN 9789990945744.
- Mark A Sammut. The Law in All Its Majesty: Essays in Maltese Legal History and Comparative Law. Russell Square Publishing Limited. 2016. ISBN 9781911301004.
- Hugh W Harding. Maltese Legal History under British rule (1801–1836). Printed at Progress Press. Valletta, Malta. 1968. WorldCat. Reprinted by Malta University Press. 1980. WorldCat.
- Proclamation No 1 of the 10th March 1854, promulgating Her Majesty's Order in Council giving effect to a Code of Laws and Regulations of Police for the Island of Malta and its Dependencies. Google Books
- F Cremona. The Law on Commercial Partnerships in Malta. University of Malta. 1989.
- Andrew Muscat. Principles of Maltese Company Law. Malta University Press. 2007. WorldCat
- Max Ganado, Ganado & Associates Advocates and the Institute of Financial Services Malta. An introduction to Maltese Financial Services Law. Allied Publications. Valletta, Malta. 2009. WorldCat
- Simone Borg and Louise Spiteri. Environmental Law in Malta. Kluwer Law International. 2010. Google Books
- Kevin Aquilina. Media Law in Malta. Kluwer Law International. 2014. ISBN 9789041153319.
