= Law of Haiti =

For Law of Haiti, many legal documents are available in the Digital Library of the Caribbean (dLOC) for Haiti in the Law Digital Collection. As explained on the Haitian Law Digital Collection page in the Digital Library of the Caribbean, the collection "includes historic through current Haitian law documents and related international documents. Contributors to this collection include dLOC partners in Haiti and around the world, LLMC Digital and its partners for the Haiti Legal Patrimony Project, and others."
