= Common law =

Law created by judicial precedent

Legal systems of the world, with common law systems in red

Common law is the body of law primarily developed through judicial decisions rather than statutes. Although common law may incorporate certain statutes, it is largely based on precedent—judicial rulings made in previous similar cases. The presiding judge determines which precedents to apply in deciding each new case.

Common law is deeply rooted in the principle of stare decisis ("to stand by [things] decided"), where courts follow precedents established by previous decisions. When a similar case has been resolved, courts typically align their reasoning with the precedent set in that decision. However, in a "case of first impression" with no precedent or clear legislative guidance, judges are empowered to resolve the issue and establish a new precedent.

The common law, so named because it was common to all the king's courts across England, originated in the practices of the courts of the English kings in the centuries following the Norman Conquest in 1066. It established a unified legal system, gradually supplanting the local folk courts and manorial courts. England spread the English legal system across the British Isles, first to Wales, and then to Ireland and overseas colonies; this was continued by the later British Empire. Many former colonies retain the common law system today. These common law systems are legal systems that give great weight to judicial precedent, and to the style of reasoning inherited from the English legal system. Today, approximately one-third of the world's population lives in common law jurisdictions or in mixed legal systems that integrate common law and civil law.

== Terminology and definitions ==
The term 'common law' has multiple distinct but related meanings. First, initially, following the Norman Conquest, the 'common law' referred to the law common to the King of England's courts, as distinct from the courts administered in local courts. Secondly, as such, term 'common law' later came to be synonymous with judge-made laws, as distinct from statutory law. Third, further, as the British Empire expanded, colonies that adopted the 'common law' judicial procedures and systems came to be known as 'common law' legal systems, as distinct from 'civil law' ones. Fourth, separately, during the late medieval period in England, a distinct set of equitable laws began to be administered by another court system, namely, the Court of Chancery. In common-law jurisdictions that have merged the two court systems, equity remains as a set of distinct legal rules, separate from the 'common law' historically administered by the common-law courts. Fifth, even after the abolition of the distinct equitable and legal court systems, England retains ecclesiastical courts that have legal jurisdiction over certain issues pertaining to religion, and 'common law' may be used to describe the laws distinct from those administered in these courts.

West's encyclopedia of American law defines common law as "The ancient law of England based upon societal customs and recognized and enforced by the judgments and decrees of the courts".

According to William Blackstone this unwritten law derived its authority from immemorial usage and "universal reception throughout the kingdom". While its precise meaning may have changed since Blackstone's time, in modern usage it is generally understood to mean law that is independent of statutes. This was repeated by the United States Supreme Court in Levy v. McCartee: "It is too plain for argument that the common law is here spoken of, in its appropriate sense, as the unwritten law of the land, independent of statutory enactments".

More specifically, in modern usage, this is understood to mean law that is made by judges, not the declaratory statutes of Blackstone's era. The term "judge made law" comes from Jeremy Bentham and the modern practice of adjudication as application of precedent derived from case law begins with Jeremy Bentham's attack on the legitimacy of the common law. The modern legal practice of applying case law as precedent made obsolete the declaratory theory of common law that prevailed in Blackstone's time.

== Basic principles of common law ==
=== Common law adjudication ===
In a common law jurisdiction, several stages of research and analysis are required to determine "what the law is" in a given situation. First, one must ascertain the facts. Then, one must locate any relevant statutes and cases. Then one must extract the principles, analogies, and statements by various courts of what they consider important to determine how the next court is likely to rule on the facts of the present case. More recent decisions, and decisions of higher courts or legislatures carry more weight than earlier cases and those of lower courts.

=== Common law evolves ===
Oliver Wendell Holmes Jr. cautioned that "the proper derivation of general principles in both common and constitutional law ... arise gradually, in the emergence of a consensus from a multitude of particularized prior decisions". Justice Cardozo noted the "common law does not work from pre-established truths of universal and inflexible validity to conclusions derived from them deductively", but "[i]ts method is inductive, and it draws its generalizations from particulars".

In contrast to common law incrementalism, the legislative process may be difficult to get started, as the work begins much earlier than just introducing a bill. Once the legislation is introduced, the process to getting it passed is long, involving a committee system, debate, a potential conference committee, voting, and approval by a head of state. Because of the involved process, many pieces must fall into place in order for it to be passed.

==== Decline of Latin maxims ====
Reliance on old maxims and rigid adherence to precedent, no matter how old or ill-considered, came under critical discussion in the late 19th century, starting in the United States. Oliver Wendell Holmes Jr. in his famous article, "The Path of the Law", commented, "It is revolting to have no better reason for a rule of law than that so it was laid down in the time of Henry IV. It is still more revolting if the grounds upon which it was laid down have vanished long since, and the rule simply persists from blind imitation of the past." Justice Holmes noted that study of maxims might be sufficient for "the man of the present", but "the man of the future is the man of statistics and the master of economics". In an 1880 lecture at Harvard, he wrote:

The life of the law has not been logic; it has been experience. The felt necessities of the time, the prevalent moral and political theories, intuitions of public policy, avowed or unconscious, even the prejudices which judges share with their fellow men, have had a good deal more to do than the syllogism in determining the rules by which men should be governed. The law embodies the story of a nation's development through many centuries, and it cannot be dealt with as if it contained only the axioms and corollaries of a book of mathematics.

The presumption is that legislatures may take away common law rights, but modern jurisprudence will look for the statutory purpose or legislative intent and apply rules of statutory construction like the plain meaning rule to reach decisions. Statutes and written constitutions are generally understood to supersede common law. They may codify existing common law, create new causes of action that did not exist in the common law, (Note: Hadley v Baxendale (1854) 9 Exch 341 (defining a new rule of contract law with no basis in statute); MacPherson v. Buick Motor Co., 217 N.Y. 382, 111 N.E. 1050 (N.Y. 1916) (adjudicating the tort of negligence that existed in no statute, and expanding the law to cover parties that had never been addressed by statute)) or legislatively overrule the common law. Common law still has practical applications in some areas of law. Examples are contract law and the law of torts. There is a controversial legal maxim in American law that "Statutes in derogation of the common law ought to be narrowly construed". Henry Campbell Black once wrote that the canon "no longer has any foundation in reason". It is generally associated with the Lochner era. As the United States Supreme Court explained in United States v Texas, 507 U.S. 529 (1993):

Just as longstanding is the principle that "[s]tatutes which invade the common law ... are to be read with a presumption favoring the retention of long-established and familiar principles, except when a statutory purpose to the contrary is evident. Isbrandtsen Co. v. Johnson, 343 U.S. 779, 783 (1952); Astoria Federal Savings & Loan Assn. v. Solimino, 501 U.S. 104, 108 (1991). In such cases, Congress does not write upon a clean slate. Astoria, 501 U.S. at 108. In order to abrogate a common-law principle, the statute must "speak directly" to the question addressed by the common law. Mobil Oil Corp. v. Higginbotham, 436 U. S. 618, 625 (1978); Milwaukee v. Illinois, 451 U. S. 304, 315 (1981).

As another example, the Supreme Court of the United States in 1877, held that a Michigan statute that established rules for solemnization of marriages did not abolish pre-existing common-law marriage, because the statute did not affirmatively require statutory solemnization and was silent as to preexisting common law.

Court decisions that analyze, interpret and determine the fine boundaries and distinctions in law promulgated by other bodies are sometimes called "interstitial common law", which includes judicial interpretation of fundamental laws, such as the US Constitution, of legislative statutes, and of agency regulations, and the application of law to specific facts.

=== Stability ===
The reliance on judicial opinion is a strength of common law systems, and is a significant contributor to the robust commercial systems in the United Kingdom and United States. Because there is reasonably precise guidance on almost every issue, parties (especially commercial parties) can predict whether a proposed course of action is likely to be lawful or unlawful, and have some assurance of consistency. As Justice Brandeis famously expressed it, "in most matters it is more important that the applicable rule of law be settled than that it be settled right." This ability to predict gives more freedom to come close to the boundaries of the law.

In contrast, in jurisdictions with very weak respect for precedent, fine questions of law are redetermined anew each time they arise, making consistency and prediction more difficult, and procedures far more protracted than necessary because parties cannot rely on written statements of law as reliable guides.

This is why the law of the State of New York is frequently chosen in commercial contracts, even when neither entity has extensive contacts with New York—and remarkably often even when neither party has contacts with the United States. Commercial contracts almost always include a "choice of law clause" to reduce uncertainty. Somewhat surprisingly, contracts throughout the world (for example, contracts involving parties in Japan, France and Germany, and from most of the other states of the United States) often choose the law of New York, even where the relationship of the parties and transaction to New York is quite attenuated. Because of its history as the United States' commercial center, New York common law has a depth and predictability not (yet) available in any other jurisdictions of the United States. Similarly, American corporations are often formed under Delaware corporate law, and American contracts relating to corporate law issues (merger and acquisitions of companies, rights of shareholders, and so on) include a Delaware choice of law clause, because of the deep body of law in Delaware on these issues. On the other hand, some other jurisdictions have sufficiently developed bodies of law so that parties have no real motivation to choose the law of a foreign jurisdiction (for example, England and Wales, and the state of California), but not yet so fully developed that parties with no relationship to the jurisdiction choose that law.

=== Legal reporting ===
In common law systems, precedents are maintained over time through court records and historically documented in collections of case law referred to as law reports and yearbooks.

After the American Revolution in 1776, Massachusetts became the first state to establish an official Reporter of Decisions. As newer states needed law, they often looked first to the Massachusetts Reports for authoritative precedents as a basis for their own common law. The United States federal courts relied on private publishers until after the Civil War, and only began publishing as a government function in 1874. West Publishing in Minnesota is the largest private-sector publisher of law reports in the United States. Government publishers typically issue only decisions "in the raw", while private sector publishers often add indexing, including references to the key principles of the common law involved, editorial analysis, and similar finding aids.

There are regular, good quality law reports in France, but it is not a consistent practice in many of the existing civil law jurisdictions. In French-speaking colonial Africa there were no law reports and what little we know of those historical cases comes from publication in journals.

=== Stare decisis ===
In the United Kingdom, since 2009, the Supreme Court of the United Kingdom has the authority to overrule and unify decisions of lower courts, being the final court of appeal for all civil law cases and criminal law cases in all jurisdictions except for Scotland, where the High Court of Justiciary has this power instead. The Supreme Court also has an appellate jurisdiction on questions of law relating to reserved matters such as devolution and human rights. From 1966 to 2009, this power lay with the House of Lords, as it declared in the Practice Statement of 1966.

In the United States, most of the U.S. federal courts of appeal have adopted a rule under which, in the event of any conflict in decisions of panels (most of the courts of appeal almost always sit in panels of three), the earlier panel decision is controlling, and a panel decision may only be overruled by the court of appeals sitting en banc or by a higher court. Other courts, for example, the Court of Appeals for the Federal Circuit (formerly known as Court of Customs and Patent Appeals) and the US Supreme Court, always sit en banc, and thus the later decision controls.

=== Evidence and litigation ===
Common law courts usually use an adversarial system, in which two sides present their cases to a neutral judge. In contrast, in civil law systems, criminal proceedings proceed under an inquisitorial system in which an examining magistrate serves two roles by first developing the evidence and arguments for one side and then the other during the investigation phase.

In contrast, in an adversarial system, on issues of fact, the onus of framing the case rests on the parties, and judges generally decide the case presented to them, rather than acting as active investigators, or actively reframing the issues presented. On the other hand, on issues of law, common law courts regularly raise new issues (such as matters of jurisdiction or standing), perform independent research, and reformulate the legal grounds on which to analyze the facts presented to them. The United States Supreme Court, in particular, regularly decides based on issues raised only in amicus briefs from non-parties.

=== Separation of powers ===
Common law systems tend to give more weight to separation of powers between the judicial branch and the executive branch. In contrast, civil law systems are typically more tolerant of allowing individual officials to exercise both powers. One example of this contrast is the difference between the two systems in allocation of responsibility between prosecutor and adjudicator.

== History ==
=== Origins ===
The common law—so named because it was common to all the king's courts across England—originated in the practices of the courts of the English kings in the centuries following the Norman Conquest in 1066. Prior to the Norman Conquest, much of England's legal business took place in the local folk courts of its various shires and hundreds. A variety of other individual courts also existed across the land: urban boroughs and merchant fairs held their own courts, and large landholders also held their own manorial and seigniorial courts as needed. The degree to which common law drew from earlier Anglo-Saxon traditions such as the jury, ordeals, the penalty of outlawry, and writs – all of which were incorporated into the Norman common law – is still a subject of much discussion. Additionally, the Catholic Church operated its own court system that adjudicated issues of canon law.

The main sources for the history of the common law in the Middle Ages are the plea rolls and the Year Books. The plea rolls, which were the official court records for the Courts of Common Pleas and King's Bench, were written in Latin. The rolls were made up in bundles by law term: Hilary, Easter, Trinity, and Michaelmas, or winter, spring, summer, and autumn. They are currently deposited in the UK National Archives, by whose permission images of the rolls for the Courts of Common Pleas, King's Bench, and Exchequer of Pleas, from the 13th century to the 17th, can be viewed online at the Anglo-American Legal Tradition site (The O'Quinn Law Library of the University of Houston Law Center).

The doctrine of precedent developed during the 12th and 13th centuries, as the collective judicial decisions that were based in tradition, custom and precedent.

=== Medieval English common law ===
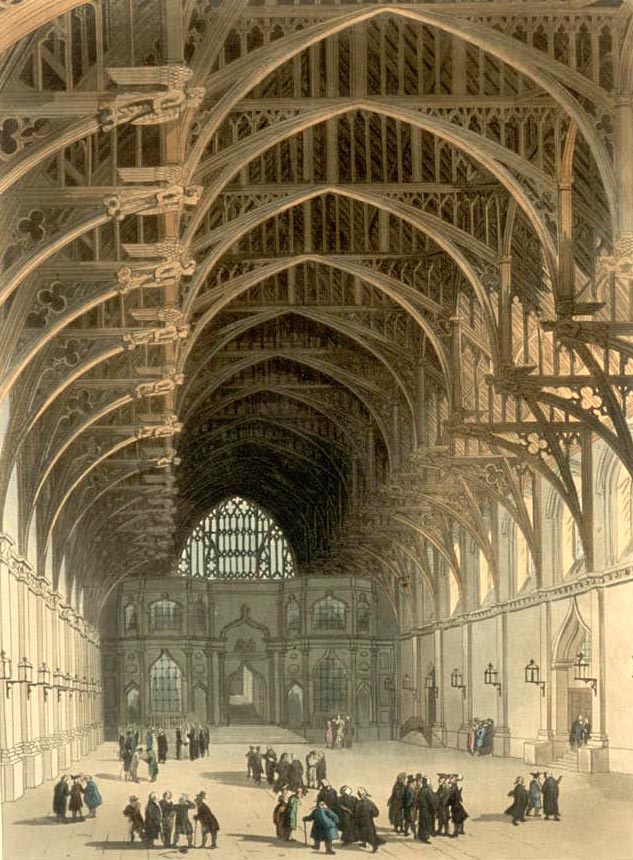
A view of Westminster Hall in the Palace of Westminster, London, early 19th century

King Henry II, the establisher of common law, had as his object the preservation of public order, but providing law and order was also extremely profitable – cases on forest use as well as fines and forfeitures generated large windfalls for the government. At the time, royal government centered on the Curia Regis (king's court), the body of aristocrats and prelates who assisted in the administration of the realm and the ancestor of Parliament, the Star Chamber, and Privy Council, but it was Henry II who developed the practice of sending judges from his Curia Regis to hear the various disputes throughout the country, and return to the court thereafter. As the administration of the eyres (a Norman French word for judicial circuit, originating from Latin iter) became more widespread, a law emerged that was 'common' to all of England, hence known as the 'common law'.

Judge-made common law operated as the primary source of law for several hundred years, before Parliament acquired legislative powers to create statutory law. In England, judges have devised a number of rules as to how to deal with precedent decisions. The early development of case-law in the thirteenth century has been traced to Bracton's On the Laws and Customs of England and led to the yearly compilations of court cases known as Year Books, of which the first extant was published in 1268, the same year that Bracton died.

=== Influence of Roman law ===
In the 12th and 13th centuries, countries in continental Europe began to receive the doctrines, principles, and practices of the ancient Roman law into their legal systems, such as codification based on the Roman law civil codes, such as the Corpus Juris Civilis. However, by that time, the English already had the common law system in place, so that common law jurisdictions often differ significantly from civil law ones in terms of judicial reasoning and the sources of law.

By the time of the rediscovery of the Roman law in Europe in the 12th and 13th centuries, the common law had already developed far enough to prevent a Roman law reception as it occurred on the continent. However, the first common law scholars, most notably Glanvill and Bracton, as well as the early royal common law judges, had been well accustomed with Roman law. Often, they were clerics trained in the Roman canon law. One of the first and throughout its history one of the most significant treatises of the common law, Bracton's De Legibus et Consuetudinibus Angliae (On the Laws and Customs of England), was heavily influenced by the division of the law in Justinian's Institutes.

The impact of Roman law had decreased sharply after the age of Bracton, but the Roman divisions of actions into in rem (typically, actions against a thing or property for the purpose of gaining title to that property; must be filed in a court where the property is located) and in personam (typically, actions directed against a person; these can affect a person's rights and, since a person often owns things, his property too) used by Bracton had a lasting effect and laid the groundwork for a return of Roman law structural concepts in the 18th and 19th centuries. Signs of this can be found in Blackstone's Commentaries on the Laws of England, and Roman law ideas regained importance with the revival of academic law schools in the 19th century. As a result, today, the main systematic divisions of the law into property, contract, and tort (and to some extent unjust enrichment) can be found in the civil law as well as in the common law.

=== Early modern era ===
The "ancient unwritten universal custom" view was the foundation of the first treatises by Blackstone and Coke, and was universal among lawyers and judges from the earliest times to the mid-19th century. As Sir Edward Coke (1552–1634) put it in the preface to the eighth volume of his Reports (1600–1615), "the grounds of our common laws" were "beyond the memorie or register of any beginning". However, for 100 years, lawyers and judges have recognized that the "ancient unwritten universal custom" view does not accord with the facts of the origin and growth of the law.

=== British Raj (19th century – 1948) ===
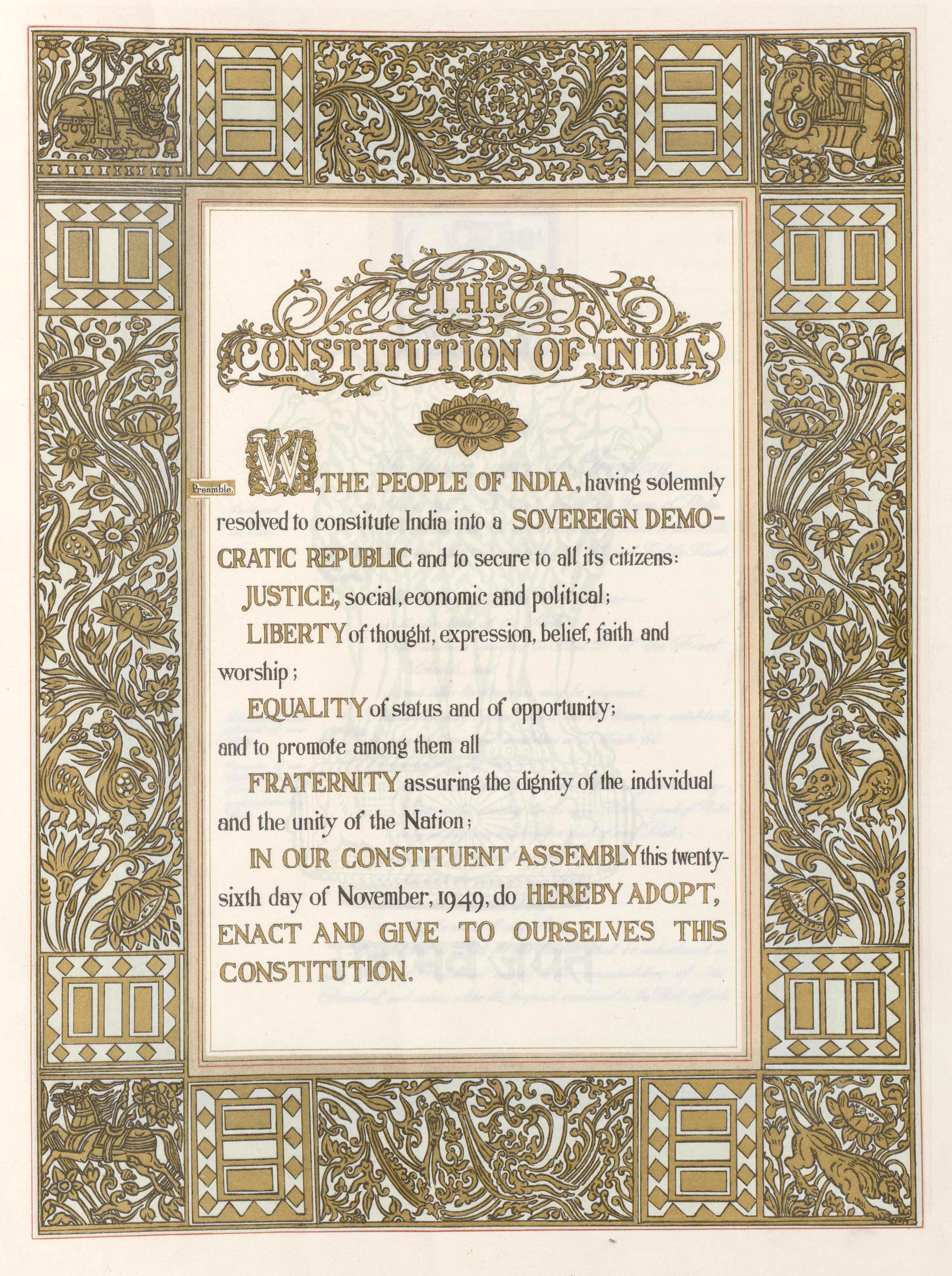
The Constitution of India is the longest written constitution for a country, containing 395 articles, 12 schedules, numerous amendments and 117,369 words.

The law of India, Pakistan, and Bangladesh are largely based on English common law because of the long period of British colonial influence during the period of the British Raj.

Ancient India represented a distinct tradition of law, and had a historically independent school of legal theory and practice. The Arthashastra, dating from 400 BCE and the Manusmriti, from 100 CE, were influential treatises in India, texts that were considered authoritative legal guidance. Manu's central philosophy was tolerance and pluralism, and was cited across Southeast Asia. Early in this period, which finally culminated in the creation of the Gupta Empire, relations with ancient Greece and Rome were not infrequent. The appearance of similar fundamental institutions of international law in various parts of the world show that they are inherent in international society, irrespective of culture and tradition. Inter-State relations in the pre-Islamic period resulted in clear-cut rules of warfare of a high humanitarian standard, in rules of neutrality, of treaty law, of customary law embodied in religious charters, in exchange of embassies of a temporary or semi-permanent character.

When India became part of the British Empire, there was a break in tradition, and Hindu and Islamic law were supplanted by the common law. After the failed rebellion against the British in 1857, the British Parliament took over control of India from the British East India Company, and British India came under the direct rule of the Crown. The British Parliament passed the Government of India Act 1858 to this effect, which set up the structure of British government in India. It established in Britain the office of the Secretary of State for India through whom the Parliament would exercise its rule, along with a Council of India to aid him. It also established the office of the Governor-General of India along with an Executive Council in India, which consisted of high officials of the British Government. As a result, the present judicial system of the country derives largely from the British system and has little correlation to the institutions of the pre-British era.

=== The United States (c. 17th century – 1776) ===
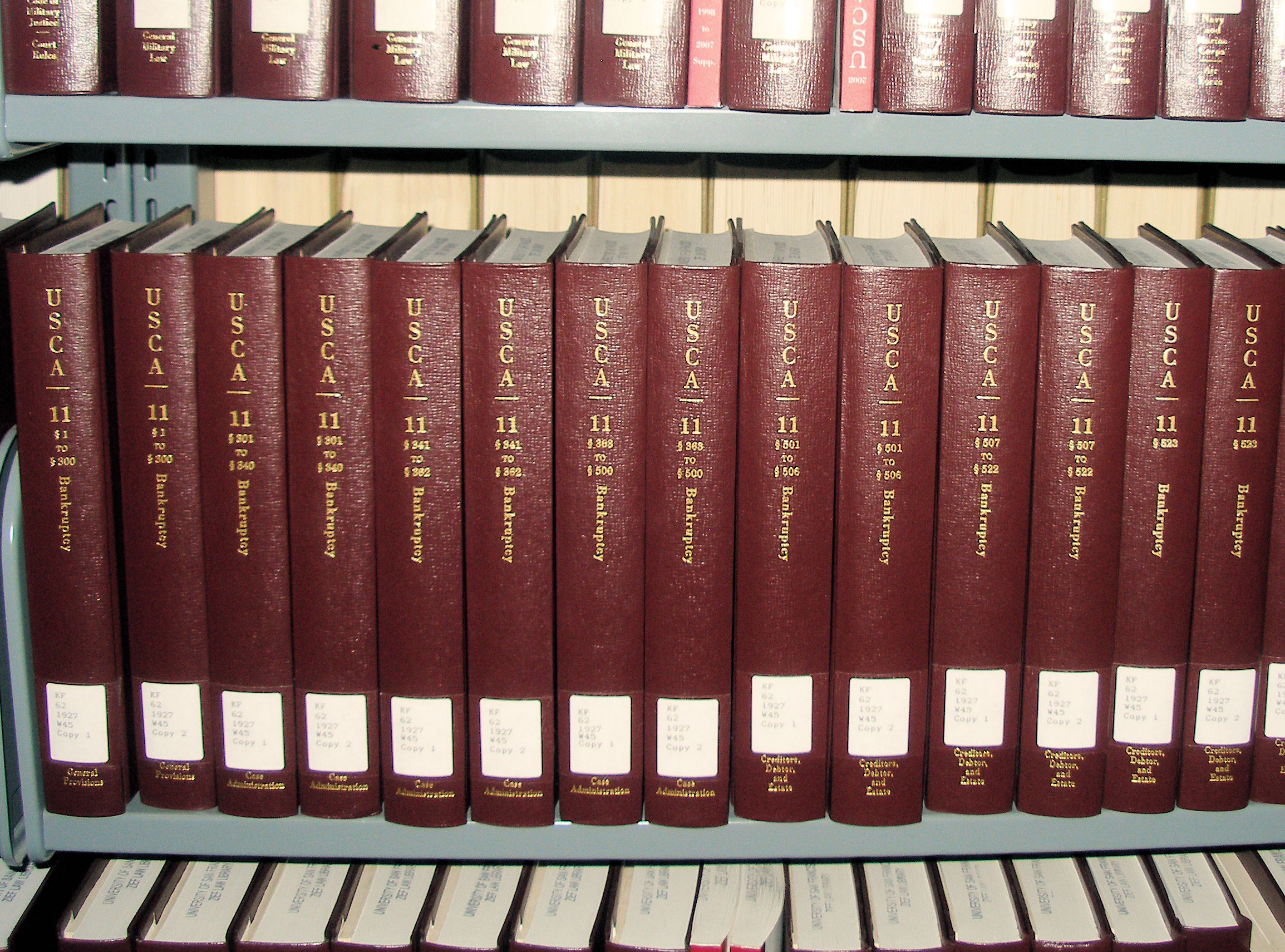
USCA: some annotated volumes of the official compilation and codification of federal statutes.

After Erie v. Tompkins, 304 U.S. 64, 78 (1938) overruled Joseph Story's decision in Swift v. Tyson, the federal common law was limited to some jurisdictions stated in the Constitution, such as admiralty, and possibly some areas that may not be the traditional jurisdiction of state law. Later courts have limited Erie slightly, to create a few situations where United States federal courts are permitted to create federal common law rules without express statutory authority, for example, where a federal rule of decision is necessary to protect uniquely federal interests, such as foreign affairs, or financial instruments issued by the federal government. (Note: See, e.g., Clearfield Trust Co. v. United States, 318 U.S. 363 (1943) (giving federal courts the authority to fashion common law rules with respect to issues of federal power, in this case negotiable instruments backed by the federal government); International News Service v. Associated Press, 248 U.S. 215 (1918) (creating a cause of action for misappropriation of "hot news" that lacks any statutory grounding)) Except on Constitutional issues, and some procedural issues, Congress is free to legislatively overrule federal courts' common law.

Post-1938, federal courts deciding issues that arise under state law are required to defer to state court interpretations of state statutes, or reason what a state's highest court would rule if presented with the issue, or to certify the question to the state's highest court for resolution. (Note: But see National Basketball Association v. Motorola, Inc., 105 F.3d 841, 843–44, 853 (2d Cir. 1997) (noting continued vitality of INS "hot news" tort under New York state law, but leaving open the question of whether it survives under federal law)) Outside diversity jurisdiction and when there is no federal statute, (Note: In the words of Justice Robert H. Jackson: "Federal common law implements the federal Constitution and statutes, and is conditioned by them.") post-Erie federal courts have continued to create causes of action. Justice Lewis Powell strongly objected to this practice in an influential dissent for the case Cannon v. University of Chicago.

=== 1870 through 20th century, and the procedural merger of law and equity ===
As early as the 15th century, it became the practice that litigants who felt they had been cheated by the common law system would petition the King in person. For example, they might argue that an award of damages (at common law (as opposed to equity)) was not sufficient redress for a trespasser occupying their land, and instead request that the trespasser be evicted. From this developed the system of equity, administered by the Lord Chancellor, in the courts of chancery. By their nature, equity and law were frequently in conflict and litigation would frequently continue for years as one court countermanded the other.

In England, courts of law (as opposed to equity) were merged with courts of equity by the Judicature Acts of 1873 and 1875, with equity prevailing in case of conflict.

In the United States, parallel systems of law (providing money damages, with cases heard by a jury upon either party's request) and equity (fashioning a remedy to fit the situation, including injunctive relief, heard by a judge) survived well into the 20th century. The United States federal courts procedurally separated law and equity: the same judges could hear either kind of case, but a given case could only pursue causes in law or in equity, and the two kinds of cases proceeded under different procedural rules. This became problematic when a given case required both money damages and injunctive relief. In 1937, the new Federal Rules of Civil Procedure combined law and equity into one form of action, the "civil action". Fed.R.Civ.P. 2. The distinction survives to the extent that issues that were "common law (as opposed to equity)" as of 1791 (the date of adoption of the Seventh Amendment) are still subject to the right of either party to request a jury, and "equity" issues are decided by a judge.

=== Common law pleading and its abolition in the early 20th century ===
For centuries, through to the 19th century, the common law acknowledged only specific forms of action, and required very careful drafting of the opening pleading (called a writ) to slot into exactly one of them: debt, detinue, covenant, special assumpsit, general assumpsit, trespass, trover, replevin, case (or trespass on the case), and ejectment.

One of the major reforms of the late 19th century and early 20th century was the abolition of common law pleading requirements. A plaintiff can initiate a case by giving the defendant "a short and plain statement" of facts that constitute an alleged wrong. This reform moved the attention of courts from technical scrutiny of words to a more rational consideration of the facts, and opened access to justice far more broadly.

=== Contemporary United Kingdom common law ===
Scotland is often said to use the civil law system, but it has a unique system that combines elements of an uncodified civil law dating back to the Corpus Juris Civilis with an element of its own common law long predating the Treaty of Union with England in 1707 (see Legal institutions of Scotland in the High Middle Ages), founded on the customary laws of the tribes residing there. Historically, Scottish common law differed in that the use of precedent was subject to the courts' seeking to discover the principle that justifies a law rather than searching for an example as a precedent.

Scotland maintains a separate criminal law system from the rest of the UK, with the High Court of Justiciary being the final court for criminal appeals. The highest court of appeal in civil cases brought in Scotland is now the Supreme Court of the United Kingdom (before October 2009, final appellate jurisdiction lay with the House of Lords).

== Jurisprudence and theory ==
Early English legal scholars and theorists believed that the common law was a reflection of the ancient Anglo-Saxon customs and norms that have existed since time immemorial, with judges not merely establishing or developing the law but actually discovering or declaring these 'unwritten rules' (lex non scripta). The "ancient unwritten universal custom" view was the foundation of the first treatises by Blackstone and Coke, and was universal among lawyers and judges from the earliest times to the mid-19th century.

However, contemporary lawyers and judges have recognized that the "ancient unwritten universal custom" view does not accord with the history of the origin and growth of the law, nor is it a workable or desirable doctrine. The term "judge-made law" was introduced by Jeremy Bentham as a criticism of this pretense of the legal profession. By the twentieth century, legal scholars, including A. V. Dicey, William Markby, Oliver Wendell Holmes, John Austin, Roscoe Pound, and Ezra Ripley Thayer, generally disavowed the historical theory of the common law, choosing instead to view the law in a positivistic or realist way, as the binding ratio decidendi of case law.

Roscoe Pound has commented that critics of judicial lawmaking are not always consistent – sometimes siding with Bentham and decrying judicial overreach, at other times unsatisfied with judicial reluctance to sweep broadly and employ case law as a means to redress certain challenges to established law. Pound argues that judges, particularly where statutes and precedent are silent or ambiguous on an issue, perform an essentially legislative function, a view assented to by Oliver Wendell Holmes. Nonetheless, as legislation and case law become more comprehensive, courts have a narrower room to operate within the bounds of statutory interpretation.

=== Financial and economic research ===
Owing to the nature of precedent in common law, the commercial strengths of common law systems include consistency, certainty and finality. Common-law judges, especially from the law and economics movement, also can exercise broader adjudicative discretion in ensuring economically efficient and commercially pragmatic outcomes.

Research into law and finance has found that common law systems contribute significantly to the development of robust commercial systems and overall economic development. As such, common law jurisdictions, such as England and Wales, California, Delaware, New York City, Hong Kong, and Singapore, are often chosen as the forum of litigation as well as the choice of law used in commercial contracts, even when none of the parties or the agreement itself has any relation to these jurisdictions.

=== Reception, influence and development of English law ===
Former British colonies that have become independent vary in their reliance upon and reception of English law. The majority of jurisdictions have implemented reception statutes that receive the historical English law, prior to independence, into their legal systems, in order to preserve legal continuity and retain the ability to draw upon an extensive and predictable body of law. Post-independence jurisdictions, with the notable exception of the United States, also generally allowed litigants to appeal to the Privy Council of the United Kingdom as an apex court, but most of these jurisdictions have abolished such rights in favour of a national supreme court.

The need to balance legal continuity and autochthonous independence has figured particularly in debates in the extent to which English law should remain recognised or influential in a new jurisdiction, including the question of whether rights of appeal to the Privy Council should be abolished. Following the American Revolution, Thomas Jefferson, argued that the common law was a threat to the nation and that a civil code would be preferable as judges were not subject to the democratic political process.

For several decades after independence, contemporaneous English law remained highly influential on American common law. For example, the decision in Byrne v Boadle (1863), which first applied the res ipsa loquitur doctrine, was followed in U.S. courts. At the same time, the autochthonous development of common law in other jurisdictions, particularly Australia, Canada, Hong Kong, and Singapore, has also influenced the development of English law.

=== Convergence of common law and civil law ===
Common law countries are increasingly adopting codes, similar to civil law systems, in areas such as bankruptcy, intellectual property, antitrust, banking regulation, securities, and tax law. In the United States, the Uniform Commercial Code (UCC) is an example of a codified framework governing various aspects of commercial law. Widely regarded as one of the most significant developments in American law, the UCC has been enacted, with some local variations, in all 50 states, the District of Columbia, Puerto Rico, and the Virgin Islands.

An example of convergence from the other direction is shown in the 1982 decision Srl CILFIT and Lanificio di Gavardo SpA v Ministry of Health (ECLI:EU:C:1982:335), in which the European Court of Justice held that questions it has already answered need not be resubmitted. This showed how a historically distinctly common law principle is used by a court composed of judges (at that time) of essentially civil law jurisdiction.

=== Mechanisms ===
In England, judges have devised a number of rules as to how to deal with precedent decisions.

== International reception and influence ==
Today, approximately one-third of the world's population lives in common law jurisdictions or in mixed legal systems that integrate common law and civil law. The common law constitutes the basis of the legal systems of:

- Australia
- Bangladesh
- Belize
- Bhutan
- Brunei
- Canada (mixed in Quebec)
- The Caribbean jurisdictions of Antigua and Barbuda, Barbados, Bahamas, Dominica, Grenada, Jamaica, St Lucia (mixed), St Vincent and the Grenadines, Saint Kitts and Nevis, Trinidad and Tobago
- Cyprus
- Fiji
- Ghana
- Guyana (mixed)
- Hong Kong
- India
- Ireland
- Israel
- Kenya
- Kiribati
- Malaysia
- Malta
- Myanmar
- Nauru
- New Zealand
- Nicaragua
- Nigeria
- Pakistan
- Philippines
- Singapore
- South Africa (mixed)
- Sri Lanka (mixed)
- Tuvalu
- United Kingdom (mixed in Scotland)
- United States (mixed in Louisiana and Puerto Rico)

== See also ==
- Books of authority
- Doom book
- Fee simple
- Indigenous law
- Outline of law
- Life estate
- Lists of case law
- List of common law national legal systems
- Rule against perpetuities
- Rule in Shelley's Case
- Slavery at common law
- Time immemorial
