= Law of Bulgaria =

Bulgarian law is a largely civil law system, based on epitomes in French law and German law. It retains increasingly fewer elements of Soviet law. This makes the state's approach to criminal law inquisitorial rather than adversarial, and is generally characterised by an insistence on formality and rationality.

== See also ==
- Constitution of Bulgaria
- Energy law
- Law enforcement in Bulgaria
