= Law of Cyprus =

The law of Cyprus (Greek: Κυπριακό Δίκαιο, romanized: Kypriakó Díkaio) is a legal system which applies within the Republic of Cyprus. Although Cypriot law is extensively codified, it is still heavily based on English common law in the sense that the fundamental principle of precedent applies.

== History ==
The majority of contemporary legal instruments and principles date back to the colonial legislation enacted by the British in the period between 1878 and 1960. Unlike in the United Kingdom the British Government of Cyprus enacted numerous codifications of the common law principles, known as Chapters. These Chapters are still in force today. For example, while in the United Kingdom the rules on civil liability are purely based on case law and the principle of negligence as expressed in Donoghue v Stephenson, Cyprus has Chapter 148 which governs the vast majority of civil liability claims.

Despite the extensive codifications the fundamental doctrine of precedent found in common law still applies. First instance courts are obliged to follow the interpretation which is given by the Supreme Court in judgments in which it establishes case law. As most of the legislation in force codifies common law principles, case law deriving from the courts of the United Kingdom or even other Commonwealth jurisdictions remain an important source of inspiration for courts in Cyprus. However, since 1960 the courts of the Republic have developed a rich body of case law of their own, which is thought to be more authoritative and better suited to the particular features of local society.

Because the island had been under Ottoman rule between 1570 and the arrival of the British in 1878, some of these codifications incorporate in them principles of Ottoman law, primarily in the field of property law. In this respect, the law of property in Cyprus is unique in that it is a mixture of several influences.

After the independence of Cyprus in 1960 and the establishment of the Constitution, another important influence was continental law. In the fields of public and administrative law, Cyprus has followed the approach found in Greek law, which in turn is based on French administrative law. In both substance and procedure, Cyprus administrative law draws from the example of the French Conseil d'état. In matters of constitutional and administrative law, the Supreme Court adopts the inquisitorial system found in continental law, whereby the court also contributes to identifying the legal and factual questions that need to be ascertained during the procedure.

The latest development in Cypriot law has been the accession of Cyprus to the European Union which has caused the harmonisation of Cypriot statutes and case law with the acquis communautaire and also introduced a number of European Union legal instruments into the Cypriot legal order.

== Hierarchy of norms ==
The legal system of Cyprus has an established hierarchy of legal rules or norms whereby certain legal rules are hierarchically superior to others. Until the accession of Cyprus to the European Union the Constitution was the hierarchically highest norm of the legal system. Today, according to Article 1(a) of the Constitution, EU law is supreme to any national law and even to the Constitution itself. The Constitution then follows and after that are international law obligations, according to Article 149 of the Constitution. Ordinary laws follow, then secondary legislation and finally administrative or implementing acts.

Laws passed by the Parliament must therefore respect European Union law, the Constitution and International Law. To this end, the Supreme Court has the ability to examine the compatibility of any law passed by the Parliament with constitutional provisions. This can be done either after a reference of the President of the Republic on the basis of Article 140 of the Constitution, or as part of an administrative law claim under Article 146. Furthermore, if the question of constitutionality of a legislative provision is raised in ordinary criminal or civil proceedings, the relevant first instance court may also examine it as a secondary issue arising in that procedure.

== Judicial system ==
The judicial system in Cyprus is composed of three levels; the first instance courts, the Court of Appeal and, the Supreme Court.

== Supreme Court ==
Prior to judicial reforms enacted on 1 July 2023, Cyprus had a two-tier justice system, meaning that between the first instance courts and the Supreme Court there were no intermediate level court for judicial remedies.

Following the judicial reforms, in accordance with section 3(8)(a) of the Administration of Justice (Miscellaneous Provisions) Law of 1964 (33/1964) the Supreme Court and its previous composition of 13 judges was divided into:

- The "new" Supreme Court composed of nine judges; and
- The establishment of the Supreme Constitutional Court composed of seven judges.

In addition, in accordance with the same Law, the Supreme Court's function as the first-level appellate court in Cyprus was transferred to the newly established Court of Appeal, thus becoming the final court of appeal in Cyprus.

=== Supreme Court ===
The Supreme Court (Greek: Ανώτατο Δικαστήριο, romanized: Anótato Dikastírio) is located in the capital, Nicosia, and is the court of final appeal for criminal and civil matters.

The Court is composed of nine judges, who are appointed by the President of the Republic of Cyprus. The official criteria for being appointed to the court is that the person must be a 'jurist of high professional and moral level'; without mentioning that they must be already part of the judiciary. Nevertheless, the vast majority of judges have been chosen from the already existing judiciary, after the suggestion of all of Supreme Court justices, acting together as the Supreme Judicial Council.

The Supreme Court hears appeals against Court of Appeal judgments issued against the decisions of a court of first instance regarding civil and criminal matters, including those of courts of special jurisdiction. The Court also presides over appellate civil jurisdiction submitted before 31 December 2017.

=== Supreme Constitutional Court ===
The Supreme Constitutional Court (Greek: Ανώτατο Συνταγματικό Δικαστήριο, romanized: Anótato Syntagmatikó Dikastírio) was established on 1 July 2023 and is composed of seven judges. The Court is the final court of appeal regarding constitutional and administrative matters.

== Court of Appeal ==
The Court of Appeal (Greek: Εφετείο, romanized: Efeteío) was established by virtue of section 3A, of the Administration of Justice (Miscellaneous Provisions) Law of 1964 (33/1964) as a dedicated appellate court in the second instance. The Court exercises appellate jurisdiction over the first instance courts, in civil and criminal cases, as well as cases involving judicial review of administrative decisions, and other decisions of courts of special jurisdiction. The Court began its operations on 1 July 2023 after taking over the Supreme Court's role as the first-level appellate court in Cyprus. The Court is composed of 16 judges.

== Courts of First Instance ==
=== District Courts ===
The District Courts (Greek: Επαρχιακά Δικαστήρια, romanized: Eparchiaká Dikastíria) deal with all civil cases at first instance level and they also have the jurisdiction to rule on certain criminal law cases. The jurisdiction of the Court spans over disputes which arise in the District in which it is located. There are currently four District Courts operating, one in Nicosia (for the Nicosia and Kyrenia Districts), one in Limassol, one in Larnaca (for the Larnaca and Famagusta Districts) and one in Paphos. District Courts have a Civil Division and a Criminal Division. In both divisions, a case is heard by a single judge. Nevertheless, the District Courts' criminal competence is limited - they may only impose sanctions which count up to five years of imprisonment.

District Court judges have three levels of hierarchy : District Judges, Senior District Judges and Presidents of District Courts. While in the Criminal Division, there is no distinction as to what level of Judge will hear a specific case, in the Civil Division, the level of the judge that will hear the case depends on the size of the claim, with only Presidents having jurisdiction over claims that extend beyond five hundred thousand euros.

In the Criminal Division, the District Courts may only hear cases in which the offence carries a maximum penalty of five years of imprisonment. Nevertheless, the Attorney General, as the Prosecutor of the Republic, has the discretion to file any type of criminal case either before the District Court or the Assize Court. Should the Attorney General choose to file the case at the District Court instead of the Assize Court, despite it being for an offence which normally carries a sentence higher than five years, the maximum penalty that may be imposed is automatically reduced to five years of imprisonment, due to the limited jurisdiction of the Criminal Division of the District Court as to the maximum sanction that it may impose.

=== Assize Courts ===
Assize Courts (Κακουργιοδικεία) are Criminal Courts which are composed of three judges, one of which must hold the position of a President of District Court and presides over the session. While Assize Courts have in theory jurisdiction to rule on any criminal law case, from misdemeanours through to murder, due to the fact that District Courts deal with most cases which carry a maximum sanction of five years imprisonment, it is primarily more severe cases which are filed in Assize Courts. These Courts have the ability to impose the heaviest of all sentences, life imprisonment.

There are no jury in Assize Courts or in the Criminal Divisions of District Courts. Nevertheless, while a majority of 2/3 is necessary for a conviction in Assize Courts with each judge having one vote, the President's vote counts for two in case there is disagreement on the height or quality of the sentence to be imposed.

=== Courts of Special Jurisdiction ===
There are three types of court which are considered of 'special jurisdiction'. These types of court include the Family Courts, the Industrial Disputes Tribunals and the Rent Control Courts.

==== Family Courts ====
Family Courts have exclusive jurisdiction when it comes to family law disputes. The Family Courts have exclusive jurisdiction to determine petitions for divorce, custody of children, maintenance and property disputes between spouses where the parties are members of the Greek Orthodox Church. If the parties belong to one of the other religious groups jurisdiction is vested in the Family Court for Religious Groups. There are three Family Courts, one for Nicosia and Kyrenia, one for Limassol and Paphos and one for Larnaca and Famagusta. There is also one Family Court for Religious Groups, based in Nicosia.Cases are heard and determined by a single judge, except divorce petitions which are heard and determined by a court composed of three judges.

==== Industrial Disputes Tribunals ====
The Industrial Disputes Tribunal has exclusive jurisdiction to determine matters arising from the termination of employment such as the payment of compensation. The Industrial Disputes Tribunal has jurisdiction to determine any claim arising out of the application of the Protection of Motherhood Law, cases of unequal treatment or sexual harassment in the workplace and disputes between Provident Funds and their members. The Industrial Disputes Tribunal is composed of a President or a Judge, who is a member of the judiciary, and two lay members appointed on the recommendation of the employers' and employees' unions. The lay members have a purely consultative role. There are currently three Industrial Tribunals in the Republic, based in Nicosia and Larnaca and Limassol.

==== Rent Control Courts ====
Finally, the Rent Control Courts have jurisdiction over leases, matters regarding recovery of possession of controlled rented property and the determination of fair rent, as well as any other incidental matter. Each Rent Control Court (of which there are currently two, one for Larnaca and Nicosia and another for Limassol and Paphos) is composed of a President, who is a member of the Judiciary, and two lay members nominated by the tenants and landlords associations. The lay members have a purely consultative role.

==== Administrative Court ====
Administrative law in Cyprus has its foundations in Article 146 of the Constitution, which allows for the judicial review of executable administrative acts. Until recently, the competence of judicial review has been reserved for the exclusive jurisdiction of the Supreme Court. In 2015 a new law was passed instituting an Administrative Court to be composed by five judges. The Court functions as a first instance administrative court.

== Reform ==
A sweeping modification of the national Civil Procedure Rules was approved by the Supreme Court of Cyprus on 19 May 2021, marking the end of an extensive period of cooperative effort involving law specialists, judges, and attorneys. This reform promises to significantly enhance the operational effectiveness of the Cyprus legal system, as well as dispute management and resolution procedures. The new Civil Procedure Rules are expected to be implemented in September 2023.

The previous Civil Procedure Rules, implemented in the 1950s, had been subjected to several unsuccessful revision attempts. Nevertheless, with the assistance of the European Commission, the Supreme Court successfully constituted a Rules Committee. The committee, composed of judges, attorneys, and a registrar, was directed by Mrs. Persefoni Panayi, the present President of the Supreme Court. In collaboration with a group of experts led by Lord Dyson, the committee drafted the new rules. These were subsequently translated into Greek and scrutinised by the committee for their practicality and feasibility.

The suggested rules encompass a broad variety of legal fields, including the institution of new courts and the modernisation of the Admiralty, Commercial Court, and Appeals rules. A public consultation was conducted throughout the revision process, during which opinions from legal professionals and the general public were considered and incorporated.
