= Law of Slovakia =

The law of the Slovak Republic is civil law.

== Constitution ==
The Constitution was passed in 1992.

== Legislature ==
The legislature is the National Council.

== Legislation ==
Legislation includes Acts.

=== Acts ===
- Act No 277/1994 Coll
- Act No 136/1995 Coll
- Act No 270/1995 Coll (Language law of Slovakia)

== Courts and judiciary ==
There is a Supreme Court of Slovakia and a Constitutional Court of Slovakia.

== Legal practitioners ==
There is a Slovak Bar Association (Slovakian: Slovenská advokátska komora).

== Criminal law ==
The Criminal Code of 2005 replaced that of 1961.

== Civil code ==
The Občiansky zákonník, or Slovak Civil Code, is derived from the Czechoslovak Civil Code of 1964.
