= Law of Austria =

The Law of Austria are the collection of laws that apply at the Federal level in Austria. It is founded on the Federal Constitutional Law of 1920. It can be divided into public law and private law.

== Judiciary system ==
Austria has 113 district courts (Bezirksgerichte), 20 provincial courts (Landesgerichte), and four higher provincial courts (Oberlandesgerichte). There is also a Supreme Court (Oberster Gerichtshof), Constitutional Court (Verfassungsgerichtshof), and Supreme Administrative Court (Verwaltungsgerichtshof).

== Access to legal information ==
Information on Austrian law is available using the Legal Information System of the Republic of Austria or Rechtsinformationssystem des Bundes.

== Life imprisonment ==
Life sentences can be given in cases of murder and other crimes resulting in someones death, genocide, crimes against humanity and war crimes, but also for major drug crimes and severe acts of (re-)engagement in National Socialist activities.

Parole may be granted to certain inmates in Austria after 15 years' imprisonment, if prison officials are satisfied that the inmate will not re-offend. This is subject to the discretion of a criminal court panel, and a possible appeal to the high court. Alternatively, the president may grant a pardon following a motion of the minister of justice. Inmates who committed their crime when they were below the age of 21 cannot be sentenced to life imprisonment. Instead, juvenile offenders can only be sentenced to a maximum of 20 years imprisonment.

== See also ==
- Courts in Austria
- Politics of Austria
