= Civil code =

Codification of the civil law

Countries with a collection of laws known formally or informally as "civil code".

A civil code is a codification of private law relating to property, family, and obligations.

A jurisdiction that has a civil code generally also has a code of civil procedure. In some jurisdictions with a civil code, a number of the core areas of private law that would otherwise typically be codified in a civil code may instead be codified in a commercial code.

== History ==
The history of codification dates back to ancient Babylon. The earliest surviving civil code is the Code of Ur-Nammu, written around 2100–2050 BC. The Corpus Juris Civilis, a codification of Roman law produced between 529 and 534 AD by the Byzantine emperor Justinian I, forms the basis of civil law legal systems that would rule over Continental Europe.

Other codified laws used since ancient times include various texts used in religious law, such as the Law of Manu in Hindu law, Islamic Sharia law, the Mishnah in Jewish Halakha law, and the Canons of the Apostles in Christian Canon law.

=== European codes and influences on other continents ===
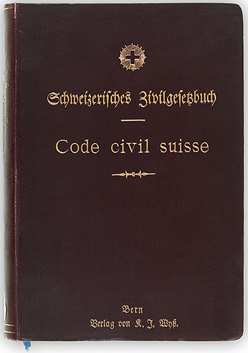
The first edition of the Swiss Civil Code (around 1907). In 1911, it became the first civil code to include commercial law (Swiss Code of Obligations).

The idea of codification re-emerged during the Age of Enlightenment, when it was believed that all spheres of life could be dealt with in a conclusive system based on human rationality, following from the experience of the early codifications of Roman Law during the Roman Empire.

The first attempts at modern codification were made in the second half of the 18th century in Germany, when the states of Austria, Prussia, Bavaria and Saxony began to codify their laws. The first statute that used this denomination was the Codex Maximilianeus bavaricus civilis of 1756 in Bavaria, still using the Latin language. It was followed in 1792 by a legal compilation that included civil, penal, and constitutional law, the Allgemeines Landrecht für die Preussischen Staaten (General National Law for the Prussian States) promulgated by King Frederick II the Great. In Austria, the first step towards fully-fledged codification were the yet incomplete Codex Theresianus (compiled between 1753 and 1766), the Josephinian Code (1787) and the complete West Galician Code (enacted as a test in Galicia in 1797). The final Austrian Civil Code (called Allgemeines bürgerliches Gesetzbuch, ABGB) was only completed in 1811 after the dissolution of the Holy Roman Empire under the influence of the Napoleonic Wars. One of the first countries to follow up through legal transplants in codification was Serbia, the Serbian Civil Code (1844).

Meanwhile, the French Napoleonic Code (Code Civil) was enacted in 1804 after only a few years of preparation, but it was a child of the French Revolution, which is strongly reflected by its content. The French code was the most influential one because it was introduced in many countries standing under French occupation during the Napoleonic Wars. In particular, countries such as Italy, the Benelux countries, Spain, Portugal (with the Civil Code of 1867, later replaced by the Civil Code of 1966, which is strongly influenced by the German BGB), the Latin American countries, the province of Quebec in Canada, and all other former French colonies which base their civil law systems to a strong extent on the Napoleonic Code. It is a misconception that the state of Louisiana in the United States based their civil code on the Napoleonic Code. Rather, the drafters of the code were instructed to write a civil code based on the current laws, and the laws that were in effect at the time were Spanish laws based on Las Siete Partidas.

The late 19th century and the beginning 20th century saw the emergence of the School of Pandectism, whose work peaked in the German Civil Code (BGB), which was enacted in 1900 in the course of Germany's national unification project, and in the Swiss Civil Code (Zivilgesetzbuch) of 1907. Those two codes had been most advanced in their systematic structure and classification from fundamental and general principles to specific areas of law (e.g. contract law, labour law, inheritance law). While the French Civil Code was structured in a "casuistic" approach attempting to regulate every possible case, the German BGB and the later Swiss ZGB applied a more abstract and systematic approach. Therefore, the BGB had a great deal of influence on later codification projects in countries as diverse as Japan, Greece, Turkey, Portugal (1966 Civil Code) and Macau (1999 Civil Code).

Since 2002 with the First law of the Civil Code of Catalonia, Parliament of Catalonia's several laws have approved the successive books of the Civil Code of Catalonia. This has replaced most of the Compilation of the Civil Law of Catalonia, several special laws and two partial codes. Only the Sixth book, relating to obligations and contracts, has to be approved.

In Europe, apart from the common law countries of the United Kingdom and Ireland, only Scandinavia remained untouched by the codification movement. The particular tradition of the civil code originally enacted in a country is often thought to have a lasting influence on the methodology employed in legal interpretation. Scholars of comparative law and economists promoting the legal origins theory of (financial) development usually subdivide the countries of the civil law tradition as belonging either to the French, Scandinavian or German group (the latter including Germany, Austria, Switzerland, Liechtenstein, Japan, China, Taiwan, South Korea and Ukraine).

=== Civil codes in the Americas ===
The first civil code promulgated in Canada was that of New Brunswick of 1804, inspired by the 1800 project of the French civil code, known as the Projet de l'an VIII (project of the 8th year); nevertheless, in 1808 a Digeste de la loi civile was sanctioned.

In the United States, codification appears to be widespread at a first glance, but U.S. legal codes are actually collections of common law rules and a variety of ad hoc statutes; that is, they do not aspire to complete logical coherence. For example, the California Civil Code largely codifies common law doctrine and is very different in form and content from all other civil codes. Another unique example is the Louisiana Civil Code, based on Spanish law Las Siete Partidas, but incorrectly credited to be based on French Law.

In 1825, Haiti promulgated a Code Civil, that was simply a copy of the Napoleonic one; while Louisiana abolished its Digeste, replacing it with the Code Civil de l'État de la Louisiane the same year.

The Mexican state of Oaxaca promulgated the first Latin American civil code in 1827, copying the French civil code.

Later on, in 1830, the civil code of Bolivia, a summarized copy of the French one, was promulgated by Andrés de Santa Cruz. The latest, with some changes, was adopted by Costa Rica in 1841.

The Dominican Republic, in 1845, put into force the original Napoleonic code, in French language (a translation in Spanish was published in 1884).

In 1852, Peru promulgated its own civil code (based on a project of 1847), which was not a simple copy or imitation of the French one, but presented a more original text based on the Castilian law (of Roman origin) that was previously in force on the Peruvian territory.

Chile promulgated its civil code in 1855, an original work in confront with the French code both for the scheme and for the contents (similar to the Castilian law in force in that territory) that was written by Andrés Bello (begun in 1833). This code was integrally adopted by Ecuador in 1858; El Salvador in 1859; Venezuela in 1862 (only during that year); Nicaragua in 1867; Honduras in 1880 (until 1899, and again since 1906); Colombia in 1887; and Panama (after its separation from Colombia in 1903).

In 1865, the Code Civil du Bas-Canada (or Civil Code of Lower Canada) was promulgated in Lower Canada (later the Canadian province of Quebec). It was replaced in 1991 by a new Civil Code of Quebec, which came into effect in 1994.

Uruguay promulgated its code in 1868, and Argentina in 1869 (work by Dalmacio Vélez Sársfield). Paraguay adopted its code in 1987, and in 1877 Guatemala adopted the Peruvian code of 1852.

Nicaragua in 1904 replaced its civil code of 1867 by adopting the Argentine code. In 1916 Brazil enacted its civil code (project of Clovis Bevilacqua, after rejecting the project by Teixeira de Freitas that was translated by the Argentines to prepare their project), that entered into effect in 1917 (in 2002, the Brazilian Civil Code was replaced by a new text). Brazilian Civil Code of 1916 was considered, by many, as the last code of the 19th century despite being adopted in the 20th century. The reason behind that is that the Brazilian Code of 1916 was the last of the important codes from the era of codifications in the world that had strong liberal influences, and all other codes enacted thereafter were deeply influenced by the social ideals that emerged after World War I and the Soviet Socialist Revolution.

Panama in 1916 decided to adopt the Argentine code, replacing its code of 1903.

Cuba had the old Civil Code of Spain until the year 1987 when the National Assembly of People's Power approved the Cuban Civil Code, Law 59.

=== Civil codes in Asia ===
The Portuguese Civil Code of 1868 was introduced in the Portuguese overseas territories of Asia (Portuguese India, Macau and Portuguese Timor) from 1870, with local modifications being latter introduced. It continued to be in effect in the former Portuguese India even after the end of the Portuguese rule in 1961. It is still in force in the present Indian territories of Goa (locally referred as the Goa civil code), Daman and Diu and Dadra and Nagar Haveli. As Macau and Portuguese Timor were still under Portuguese rule when the Portuguese Civil Code of 1868 was replaced by that of 1966, this later was adopted by these territories. In East Timor (ex-Portuguese Timor), the Portuguese Code was replaced by the Indonesian Code when Indonesia occupied that territory in 1975. Macau adopted its own Civil Code in 1999, although this being based in the Portuguese Code of 1966.

Also the civil code of Spain of 1889 would be enforced in its colony, the Philippines, and this would remain in effect even after the end of Spanish rule until the Philippines enacted its own Civil Code in 1950 after almost fifty years of U.S. rule.

Many legal systems of other countries in Asia are within the civil law tradition and have enacted a civil code, mostly derived from the German civil code; that is the case of China, Japan, Korea, Thailand (the Civil and Commercial Code), Taiwan and Indonesia (which is influenced by the Dutch Civil Code, Burgerlijke Wetboek).

The Indian Constitution in its Directive Principles of State Policy recommends to a Uniform Civil Code in ts Article 44. The Indian parliament is yet to pass a law in this regard. Several Indian states have implemented a uniform civil code. In 2024, Uttarakhand became the first state to implement a civil code in India, followed by Gujarat and Assam in 2026.

== Contents of a civil code ==
A typical civil code deals with the fields of law known to the common lawyer as law of contracts, torts, property law, family law and the law of inheritance. Commercial law, corporate law and civil procedure are usually codified separately.

The older civil codes such as the French, Egyptian, Austrian and Spanish ones are structured under the Institutional System of the Roman jurist Gaius and generally have three large parts:

- Law of Persons (personae)
- Law of Things (res)
- Issues common to both parts (actiones).

The newer codes such as the ones of Germany, Switzerland, Greece, Portugal, Romania and Catalonia are structured according to the Pandectist System:

- General part
- Law of Obligation
- Law of Real Rights
- Family Law
- Law of Inheritance

The civil code of the state of Louisiana, following the institutions system, is divided into five parts:

- Preliminary Title
- Of Persons
- Things and Different Modifications of Ownership
- Of Different Modes of Acquiring the Ownership of Things
- Conflict of Laws

Pandectism also had an influence on the earlier codes and their interpretation. For example, Austrian civil law is typically taught according to the Pandect System (which was devised by German scholars in the time between the enactment of the Austrian and the German Codes), even though this is not consistent with the structure of the Code.

== List of civil codes ==
Country/region	Name	Year of promulgation	Status	Note
Argentina	Civil Code of Argentina	1871	Defunct	
Argentina	Civil and Commercial code of Argentina	2015	In force	Replaced the previous Civil Code of Argentina
Austria	Allgemeines bürgerliches Gesetzbuch	1812	In force	
Albania	Civil Code of the Republic of Albania	1994	In force	
Armenia	Armenian Civil Code	1998	In force	
Bavaria	Codex Maximilianeus bavaricus civilis	1756	Defunct	
Brazil	Código Civil (1916 Civil Code)	1916	Defunct	
Brazil	Código Civil (2002 Civil Code)	2002	In force	Replaced the previous 1916 Civil Code
Cuba	Código Civil (1987 Civil Code)	1987	In force	Replaced the previous Spanish Civil Code
California	California Civil Code	1872	In force	
Catalonia	Codi civil de Catalunya (Civil Code of Catalonia)	First Book: 2002; Second Book: 2010; Third Book: 2008; Fourth Book: 2008; Fifth Book: 2006; Sixth Book: 2018	In force	Replaced most of the Compilation of the Civil Law of Catalonia, several special laws and two partial codes; See: First Book (official consolidated text in Catalan and text in English), Second Book (official consolidated text in catalan and text in English), Third Book (official consolidated text in Catalan), Fourth Book (official consolidated text in Catalan and text in English), Fifth Book (official consolidated text in Catalan and text in English); and the bill of the Sixth Book (text in Catalan)
Chile	Código Civil (Civil Code)	1855	In force	Drafted mostly by Andrés Bello and the basis of the codes of Colombia, Ecuador and other Latin American countries
Czech Republic	Občanský zákoník (Civil Code)	2012	In force	On 1 January 2014 was replaced by new Občanský zákoník (Civil Code) enacted in 2012; Replaced an earlier code from 1964; English translation by Ministry of Justice of Czech Republic available ()
China	民法典, Minfadian (Civil Code)	2020	The legislation of the Civil Code of China was started in 1954, after the first Constitution was adopted. However, legislation was stopped and resumed for several times, while China adopted several civil laws instead. In 2014, the current legislation procedure started, and the first part, the General Provisions, was adopted in 2017 National People's Congress. Despite the delay of the 2020 National People's Congress due to the COVID-19 pandemic, the Congressmen gathered in Beijing on May 22 to discuss and vote for the Civil Code. It was passed on May 28 and came into force on January 1, 2021.	
Denmark	Codex Holmiensis	1241	Defunct	
Egypt	Egyptian Civil Code	1948	In force	
France	Code civil des Français (French Civil Code)	1804	In force	Later Code Napoléon and today Code civil. Replaced the Custom of Paris. Inspired by Justinian's sixth-century codification of Roman law. Differ with comprehensive rewrite including earlier rules, in a rational structure rather than a religious content. This made laws clearer and more accessible and superseded the conflict between royal and judges legislative power. This code prohibits judges from deciding a case by way of introducing a general rule — an exercise of legislative — thus, there is no rule of stare decisis (binding precedent) in French law, but some jurisprudence constante, to interpret the law. It might also had influenced other countries.
Georgia	საქართველოს სამოქალაქო კოდექსი (Civil Code)	1997	In force	The First Civil Code in the history of Independent Georgia. Code was made by the assistance of German lawyers and academics.
Germany	Bürgerliches Gesetzbuch (Civil Code)	1900	In force	
Greece	Αστικός Κώδικας (Civil Code)	1946	In force	Replaced the Hexabiblos and the Civil Law of 1856; also locally the 1841 Ionian Civil Code, 1899 Civil Code of Samos, and the 1904 Cretan Civil Code
Indonesia	Burgerlijk Wetboek (Civil Code of 1838)	1848	In force	Still in force in Indonesia since 1848, while its replaced by Nieuw Burgerlijk Wetboek in The Netherlands. This Civil Code as known as Civil Code of Indonesia.
Italy	Codice Civile (Civil Code)	1942	In force	
Japan	民法, Minpō (Civil Code)	Parts 1–3: 1896; Parts 4–5: 1898	In force	
South Korea	민법, Minbeop (Civil Code)	1958	In force	
Latvia	Civillikums (Civil law)	1937	In force	
Louisiana	Louisiana Civil Code	1825	Replaced the Louisiana Civil Code Digest of 1808	
Macau	Código Civil (Civil Code)	1999	Replaced the 1966 Portuguese Civil Code	
Mesopotamia	Code of Hammurabi	c. 1780 BC	Defunct	
Nepal	Muluki Ain (Civil Code) Act, 2018 (Civil Code)	2018	In force	
Netherlands	Burgerlijk Wetboek (Civil Code of 1838)	1838	Defunct	Still in force in Indonesia since 1848, as the Indonesian Civil Code. It was also applied in Timor-Leste, de facto from 1976 to 2002 and de jure from 2002 to 2011.
Netherlands	Nieuw Burgerlijk Wetboek (Civil Code of 1992)	1992	In force	Replaced the 1838 Civil Code in its entirety; came into force in 1992, replacing the Napoleonic-based code with a German-influenced code
Philippines	Civil Code of the Philippines	1950	In force	Replacing the Civil Code of Spain which had been in force from 1889 to 1949
Poland	Kodeks cywilny (Civil Code)	1964	In force	Official text in Polish
Portugal	Código Civil (1868 Civil Code)	1868	In force	Replaced in Portugal itself by the 1966 Civil Code. However, it is still in force in the territories of the former Portuguese India (now part of the Republic of India), since it was introduced there in 1870, namely in Goa (referred as the Goa civil code), Daman and Diu and Dadra and Nagar Haveli. It was proposed to serve as the basis for the establishment of a common uniform civil code of India.
Portugal	Código Civil (1966 Civil Code)	1968	In force	Replaced the Civil Code of 1868 in Portugal and its overseas territories. Besides being in force in Portugal, it is also in force in Angola, Cape Verde, Guinea-Bissau, Mozambique and São Tomé and Príncipe. It also has a marked influence in the Macau Civil Code of 1999, the Brazilian Civil Code of 2002 and the Timor-Leste Civil Code of 2011.
Prussia	Allgemeines Landrecht (General Law of the Land)	1794	Defunct	An incredibly casuistic, and thus unsuccessful, code of 11000 sections
Puerto Rico	Puerto Rico Civil Code	1930	In force	Reproduction of the Spanish Civil Code, with the inclusion of some articles from the Louisiana Civil Code. Title 31 of the Laws of Puerto Rico.
Quebec	Civil Code of Lower Canada	1865	Defunct	In force in Quebec until being replaced by the Civil Code of Quebec in 1994. Replaced the Custom of Paris.
Quebec	Code civil du Québec (Civil Code of Quebec)	1994	In force	Replaced the former Civil Code of Lower Canada
Romania	Civil Code of Romania	2011	In force	Replaced the Civil Code of 1865
Russia	Civil Code of Russia	1994	In force	
Serbia	Грађански законик, Građanski zakonik (Civil Code)	1844	Defunct	Drafted by Jovan Hadžić; officially defunct in 1946 but mostly repealed in 1978 by a new Obligations Act; some articles which have no legal equivalent in current day Serbian law are still in force
Spain	Código Civil (Civil Code)	1889	In force	
Sweden	Civil Code of 1734	1736	In force	
Switzerland	Zivilgesetzbuch (Civil Code)	1907	In force	
Taiwan	民法 (中華民國) (Civil Code)	PART I General Principles: May 23, 1929; PART II Obligations: November 22, 1929; PART III Rights In Rem: November 30, 1929; PART IV Family: December 26, 1930; PART V Succession: December 26, 1930	In force	
Thailand	Civil and Commercial Code	Books 1–2: 1923; Book 3: 1925; Book 4: 1930; Book 5: 1935; Book 6: 1935	In force	
Turkey	Türk Medeni Kanunu (Civil Code)	2001	In force	Replaced the 1926 Turkish Civil Code
Ukraine	Civil Code of Ukraine	2004	In force	

== See also ==
- Civil law
- Criminal code
