= Marseille Courthouse =

Building in Marseille, France

Coordinates: 43.2913°N 5.3749°E

- Palais de justice de Marseille
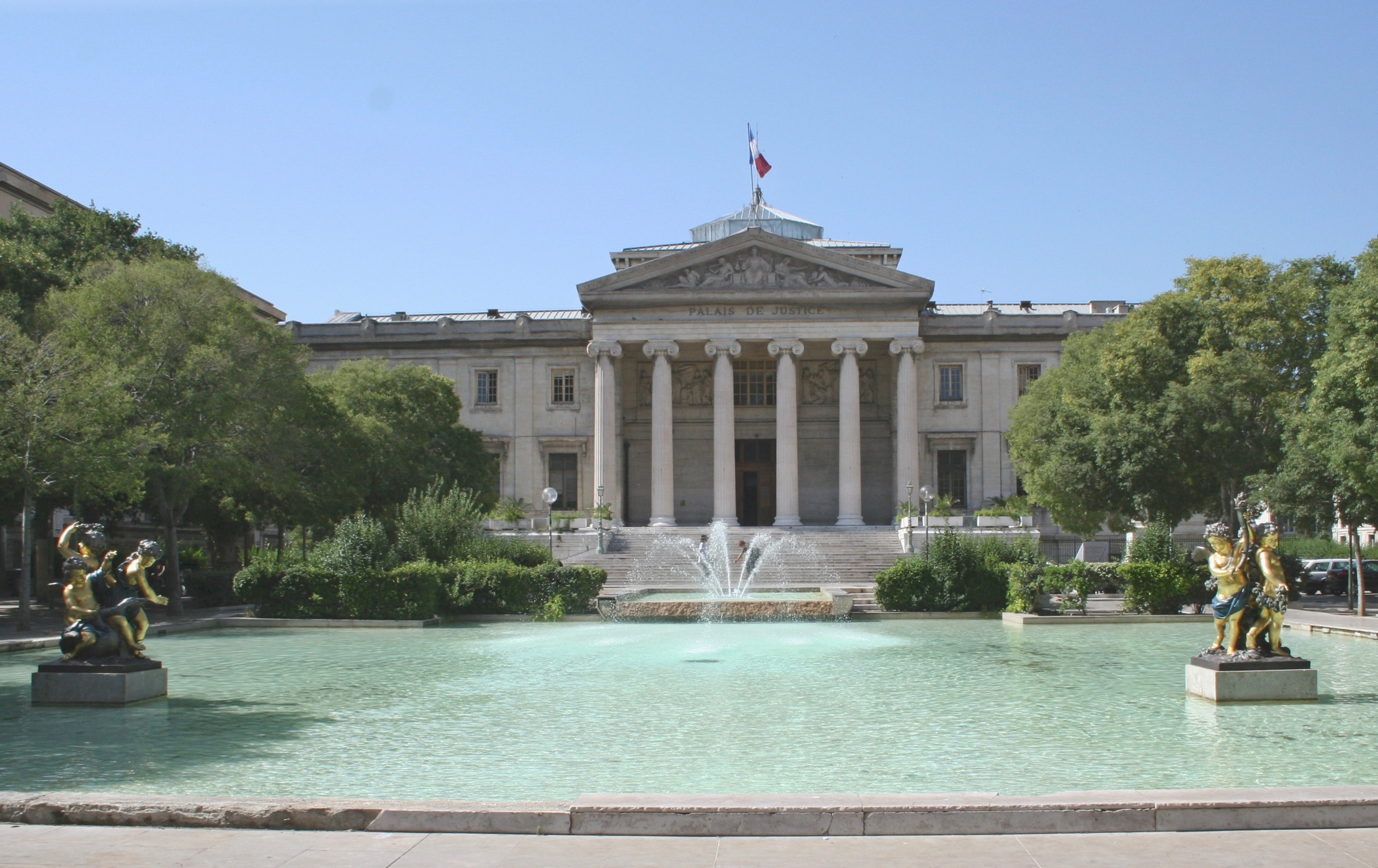
- Interactive map of Marseille Courthouse
- Location: Marseille, France
- Designer: Auguste Martin
- Type: Courthouse
- Beginning date: 1856
- Completion date: 1862

The Marseille Courthouse (French:Palais de justice de Marseille) is a neoclassical building located on Place Montyon, in the 6th arrondissement of Marseille, France.

== History ==
The first courthouse was built between 1743 and 1747 in the old town, on Place Daviel, opposite the église des Accoules. In the building known as Hôtel Daviel is currently found the local office of the mayor. At the beginning of the 19th century, the location of the Hôtel Daviel was found to be insufficient for the task, and La Coste proposed in 1839 to the General Council that a reconstruction project was put in place for the old palace.

After some discussion, the decision was made to transfer the courthouse to Place Montyon. The council approved this plan on 15, and the foundations were laid in the city of Marseille. The architect was M. Auguste Martin. The inauguration took place on 4 and the bishop of Marseille, Mgr Patrice Cruice, celebrated a mass in one of the meeting rooms. M. Mourier, Imperial Procurer, pronounced the building open at the inaugural meeting, led by Edouard Luce, President of Civil Tribunal.

Further renovation works were launched at the beginning of 2013, and it was closed to the public, and operations were moved to the caserne du Muy, before reopening in 2015.

== Exterior ==
The neoclassical building is 57 metres long, and 54 metres high, in line with most Courthouses built during the Second Empire. The main facade faces onto Place Montyon, named after Jean-Baptiste de Montyon, intendant of Provence in the 18th century. At the centre of this façade is a monumental door made of a stoop of 25 steps, a peristyle of Ionic order of six columns topped with a triangular front on which is a representation of Justice with its right to Force and the defeat of Crime represented by the head of a man to the left of Prudence and Innocence. This group was sculpted by Guillaume. The same sculptor also made two bas reliefs placed under the porch representing repressive justice and protecting justice. The rear façade, on rue Grignan, is less decorated, with only sculptures on the front of the Napoleonic armies and two lions on a commemorative table, all sculpted by Émile Aldebert. Two statues by Joseph Marius Ramus occupy the corners of the peristyle and represent Force and Prudence. The front of the side façades were created by Pierre Travaux; they represent the East on the side of rue Breteuil, Closure and Moderation, and on the West side, on rue Émile Pollak, Vigilance and Wisdom.

== Interior ==
The main chamber is 16 metres long; it has 16 red Languedoc marble columns supporting a higher gallery on the first floor. The archway consists of 4 sides, divided into 5 coffers, with 4 smaller in the centre. The large coffers each represent a legislator, while each of the smaller coffers represent juridical figures who worked at the time of that legislator. The portraits are:

- Solon with Thalès, Anacharsis, Brias and Epimenides;
- Justinian I with Tribonian, Thallèle, Théophile and Dorothée;
- Charlemagne with Alcuin, Ansegisus, Angilbert and Einhard;
- Napoleon with Cambacérès, Tronchet, Portalis and Bigot de Préameneu, editors of the Napoleonic Code (with Jacques de Maleville).

On the arches are also figures representing the qualities required for magistrates: force, equity, reason, rights, liberty, authority, truth, and eloquence. All the decoration of the archways is by François Gilbert.

== Bibliography ==
- Bouyala d’Arnaud, André (1969). Évocation du vieux Marseille (in French). Paris: Les éditions de minuit. p. 447.
- Lucien Tirone, Régis Bertrand (1991). Le guide de Marseille (in French). Besançon: Les guides de la Manufacture. p. 376. ISBN 2-7377-0276-3..
- Fabre, Augustin (1869). Les rues de Marseille (in French). Marseille: Édition Camoin.
- Teisseire, Raymond (1932). Histoire des juridictions et des palais de justice de Marseille depuis leur origine jusqu'à nos jours (in French). Marseille: Tacussel..
- Masson, Paul. Encyclopédie départementale des Bouches-du-Rhône (in French). Vol. 6. Archives départementales des Bouches-du-Rhône, Marseille. pp. 807–808.
