= Six Codes =

Term used for legal codes in East Asia

Chinese name
- Chinese: 六法
Transcriptions
Standard Mandarin
- Hanyu Pinyin: Liù Fǎ
- Bopomofo: ㄌㄧㄡˋ ㄈㄚˇ
- Gwoyeu Romatzyh: liowfaa
- Wade–Giles: liu⁴-fa³
- Tongyong Pinyin: liòufǎ
- MPS2: liòufǎ
Hakka
- Pha̍k-fa-sṳ: Liuk-fap
Southern Min
- Hokkien POJ: Lio̍k-hoat, La̍k-hoat
- Tâi-lô: Lio̍k-huat, La̍k-huat

Korean name
- Hangul: 육법
- Hanja: 六法
Transcriptions
- Revised Romanization: yukbeop
- McCune–Reischauer: ryukpŏp

Japanese name
- Kanji: 六法
- Kana: ろっぽう
Transcriptions
- Romanization: roppō

Six Codes (Chinese: 六法; pinyin: Liù Fǎ; Kana: ろっぽう; Hangul: 육법) refers to the six main legal codes that make up the main body of law in Japan, Korea, and Republic of China (Taiwan). Sometimes, the term is also used to describe the six major areas of law. Furthermore, it may refer to all or part of a collection of statutes.

| | Japan | Republic of Korea | Republic of China |
|---|---|---|---|
| 1 | Constitution (1946) 日本国憲法; Nippon-koku-kenpō | Constitution (1948) 대한민국 헌법 大韓民國憲法; Daehan-minguk Heon-beop | Constitution (1946) 中華民國憲法; Zhōnghuá Mínguó Xiànfǎ (Mandarin Pinyin); Chunghua Minkuo Hsienfa (Wade-Giles); Tiong-hoâ Bîn-kok Hiàn-hoat (Hokkien); Chûng-fà Mìn-koet Hién-fap (Hakka) |
| 2 | Civil Code (1896) 民法; Minpō | Civil Code (1958) 민법 民法; Min-beop | Civil Code (1929) 民法; Mínfǎ (Mandarin Pinyin); Minfa (Wade-Giles); Bîn-hoat (Hokkien); Mìn-fap (Hakka) |
| 3 | Code of Civil Procedure (1996) 民事訴訟法; Minji-soshō-hō | Code of Civil Procedure (1960) 민사소송법 民事訴訟法; Minsa-sosong-beop | Code of Civil Procedure (1930) 民事訴訟法; Mínshìsùsòngfǎ (Mandarin Pinyin); Minshihsusungfa (Wade-Giles); Bîn-sū Sò͘-siōng-hoat (Hokkien); Mìn-sṳ Su-siung-fap (Hakka) |
| 4 | Penal Code (1907) 刑法; Keihō | Criminal Code (1953) 형법 刑法; Hyeong-beop | Criminal Code (1935) 刑法; Xíngfǎ (Mandarin Pinyin); Hsingfa (Wade-Giles); Hêng-hoat (Hokkien); Hìn-fap (Hakka) |
| 5 | Code of Criminal Procedure (1948) 刑事訴訟法; Keiji-soshō-hō | Code of Criminal Procedure (1954) 형사소송법 刑事訴訟法; Hyeongsa-sosong-beop | Code of Criminal Procedure (1928) 刑事訴訟法; Xíngshìsùsòngfǎ (Mandarin Pinyin); Hsingshihsusungfa (Wade-Giles); Hêng-sū Sò͘-siōng-hoat (Hokkien); Hìn-sṳ Su-siung-fap (Hakka) |
| 6 | Commercial Code (1899) 商法; Shōhō | Commercial Code (1962) 상법 商法; Sang-beop | Administrative laws (1933) 行政法; Xíngzhèngfǎguī (Mandarin Pinyin); Hsingchêngfakuei (Wade-Giles); Hêng-chèng Hoat-kui (Hokkien); Hàng-chṳn Fap-kûi (Hakka) |

The word roppō is a slightly adapted form of the word used in Japanese to describe the Napoleonic Les cinq codes (ナポレオン五法典 Napoleon go-hōten) when it was brought over during the early Meiji period. Although, French Emperor Napoleon enacted five major codes, which were, in Japanese, altogether metonymically referred to as "the Napoleonic Code" (the official name of the Civil Code, the first and most prominent one), the Japanese added to this their own constitution to form six codes in all, and thus it came to be called the roppō or "six codes".

Legislation in Japan tends to be terse. The statutory volume Roppō Zensho (literally: Book of Six Codes), similar in size to a large dictionary, contains all six codes as well as many other statutes enacted by the Diet.

The Six Codes were introduced to China in 1905 after the reform and modernization of the Chinese legal system led by Cixi. Such reform was based on the similar laws adopted in Germany, France, and Japan. After the establishment of Nationalist Government, the Complete Book of Six Codes was passed on October 3 1928. The Chinese Communist Party abolished the practices of Six Codes on the land of Communist control in February 1949.

As a result of Japanese colonial rule and the Retreat of the Republic of China to Taiwan, the legal system in Taiwan is strongly influenced by Japan and China. As a result, the terms Six Codes and Book of Six Codes are also widely used in Taiwan.

== See also ==
- Les cinq codes

Japan
- Constitution of Japan
- Law of Japan
- Supreme Court of Japan
- Ministry of Justice (Japan)
Republic of Korea
- Constitution of South Korea
- Law of South Korea
- Constitutional Court of Korea
- Supreme Court of Korea
- Ministry of Justice (South Korea)
Republic of China
- Constitution of the Republic of China
- Law of Taiwan
- Judicial Yuan
- Ministry of Justice (Taiwan)
