= Second session of the 14th National People's Congress =

Election session in China

2024 National People's Congress; 第十四届全国人民代表大会第二次会议; _{2nd plenary session of the}; _{14th National People's Congress}; 5 March – 11 March
President	Premier	Congress Chairman
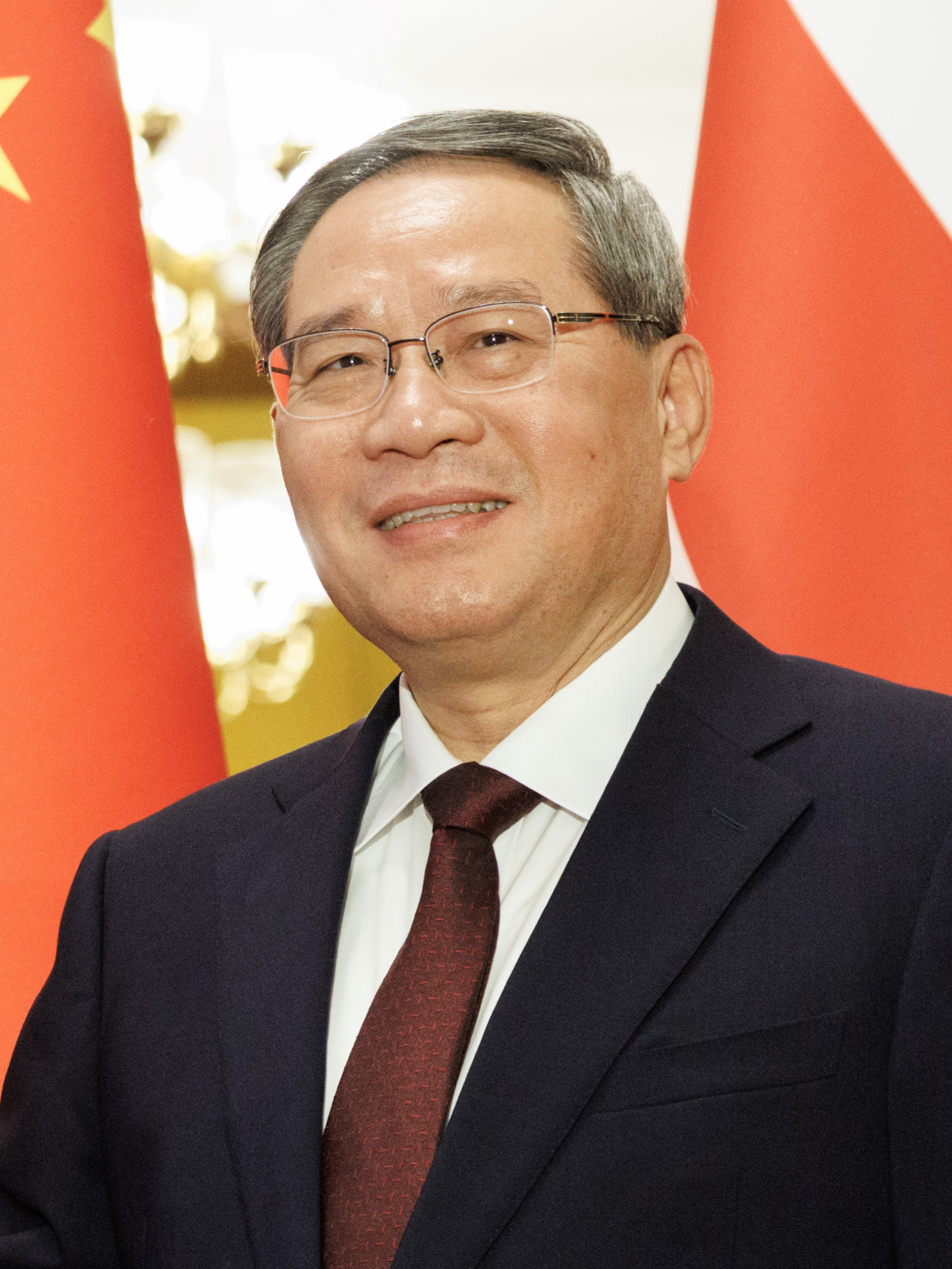
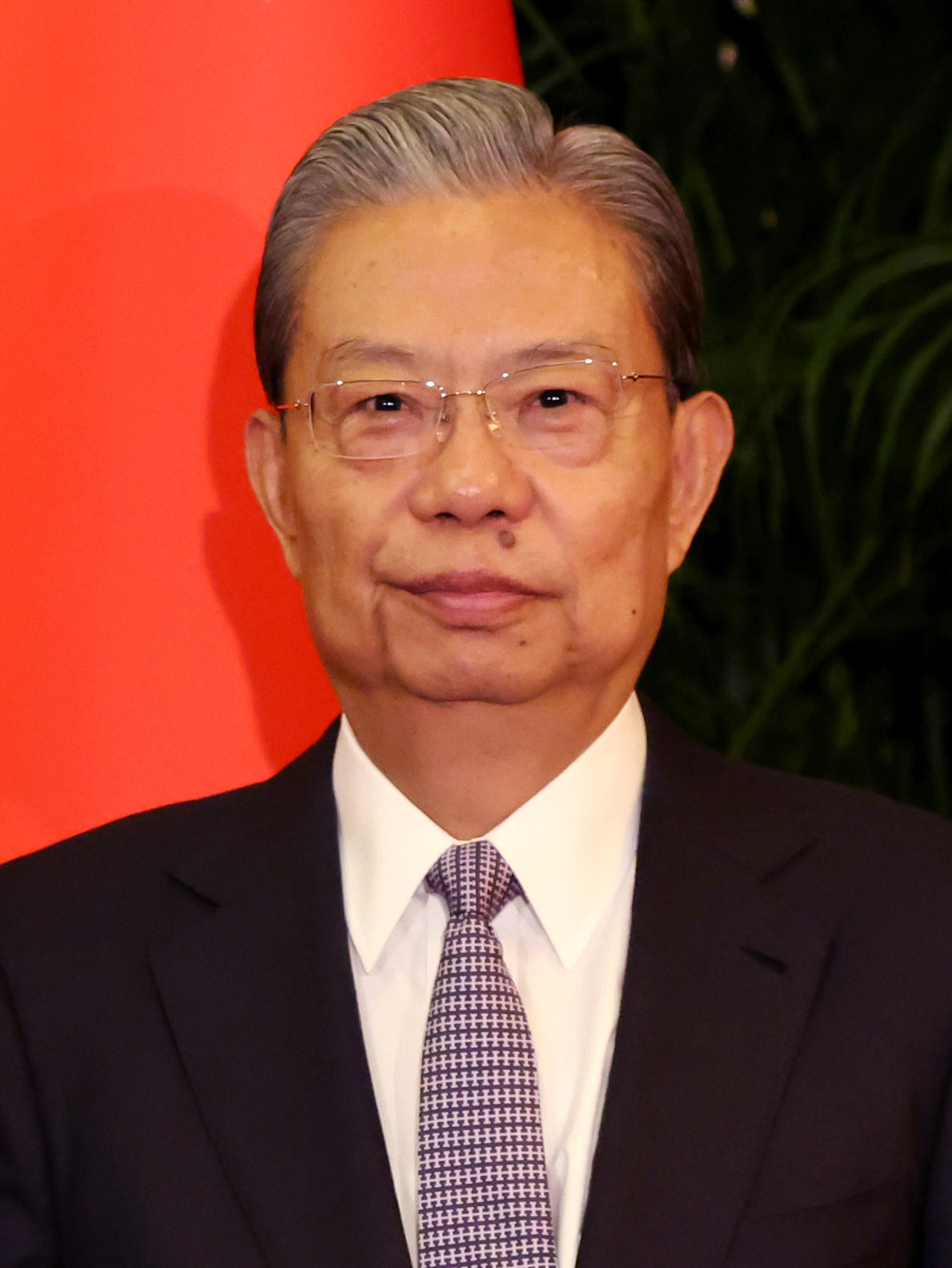
Xi Jinping	Li Qiang	Zhao Leji
since 10 March 2023	since 11 March 2023	since 10 March 2023

The second session of the 14th National People's Congress of the People's Republic of China (PRC) was held from 5 March to 11 March 2024, concurrently with the Chinese People's Political Consultative Conference (CPPCC) as part of the annual Two Sessions. The 14th National People's Congress was held at the Great Hall of the People in Beijing.

The event was held largely without COVID restrictions for the first time since the COVID-19 pandemic. On 4 March, the NPC spokesperson Lou Qinjian said Premier Li Qiang won't hold the annual press conferences for the remaining term of China's parliament, which ends in 2027, ending a tradition maintained for three decades.

== The session ==
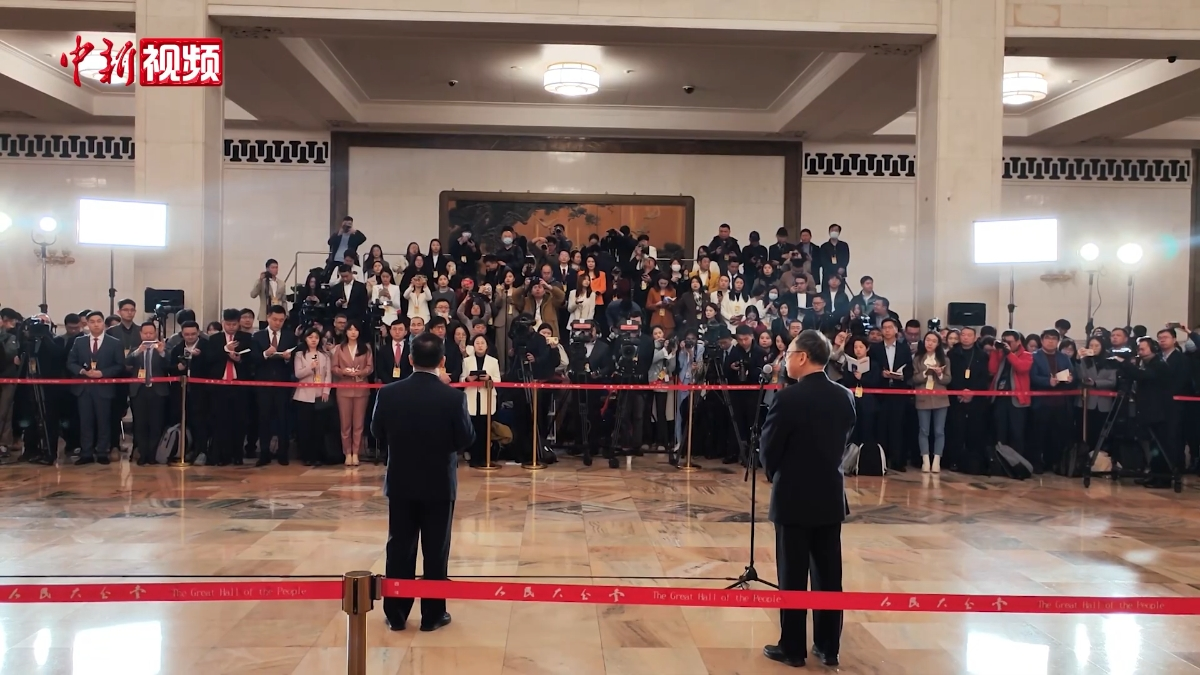
NPC deputies meet with the press before the start of the session

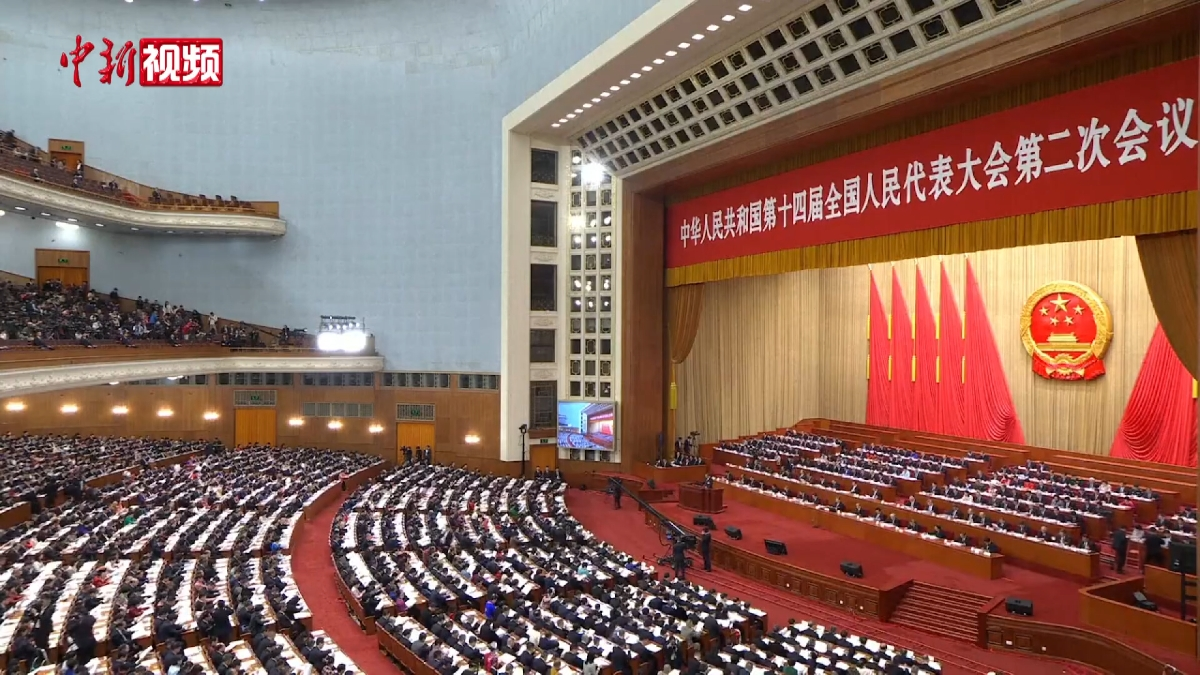
The session on 5 March

In his maiden government work report on 5 March, Premier Li Qiang spent considerable time discussing how to help struggling private players as well as ease the concerns of foreign businesses. He promised the government would settle overdue payments owed to private businesses. The report mentioned that the government would want to make it easier for migrant workers to be able to change their hukous to urban ones, a subject has long been discussed. It also mentioned that China will improve birth policy to support a growing elderly population by raising benefits and basic pensions and pushing forward a private pension system. Li said Hong Kong should continue implementing the governing principles of "One country, two systems" and "patriotic administration", and added that Beijing would support Hong Kong in developing its economy and improving residents' livelihood. He attributed a litany of achievements in 2023 to Xi, and called for officials to rally more closely around the Chinese Communist Party with Xi Jinping at its core. Li rattled off the report in 50 minutes, the shortest time since 2001. Xinhua News Agency summarized the highlights of the report, including:

- 2024 GDP growth target: around 5 percent
- Creating over 12 million jobs in urban areas
- Ratio of deficit to GDP: 3 percent
- Special-purpose bonds for local governments: 3.9 trillion yuan
- Issuing ultra-long special treasury bonds
- Launching AI Plus initiative
- Enhancing disruptive and frontier technology research
- Launching year-long program to stimulate consumption
- Investment from central government budget: 700 billion yuan
- Expanding domestic demand
- Ensuring national treatment for foreign-funded enterprises
- Working toward joining the Comprehensive and Progressive Agreement for Trans-Pacific Partnership
- Pursuing higher-standard opening up
- Defusing risks in property, local debt, small and medium-sized financial institutions
- Ensuring both development and security
- Advancing energy revolution
- Opposing "Taiwan independence" and external interference

Xi Jinping, Li Qiang, Zhao Leji, Wang Huning, Ding Xuexiang, Li Xi and Han Zheng attended separately deliberations at the second session of the 14th NPC on later that day, 6 March and 7 March. On 7 March, the delegation of deputies from Xinjiang in a group meeting denied persecution of Uyghurs and pledged to continuous opening-up.

On 8 March, the NPC deputies held group meetings to review the work report of the NPCSC. Zhao Leji delivered the report at the second plenary meeting of the second session of the 14th NPC. The report pledged to enact legislation including an emergency management law and atomic energy law, and will revise laws on national defence education and cybersecurity.

== Voting results ==
=== Resolutions ===
Topic	For	Against	Abstain	Rate
Premier Li Qiang's Government Work Report	2,895	2	3	99.83%
Amendment to the Organic Law of the State Council	2,883	8	9	99.41%
Report on the Implementation of the 2023 National Economic and Social Development Plan and the 2024 Draft Plan	2,879	10	11	99.28%
Report on the Execution of the Central and Local Budgets for 2023 and on the Draft Central and Local Budgets for 2024	2,876	13	11	99.17%
Chairman Zhao Leji's NPCSC Work Report	2,888	7	5	99.58%
Chief Justice Zhang Jun's Supreme People's Court Work Report	2,834	4	22	97.72%
Procurator-General Ying Yong's Supreme People's Procuratorate Work Report	2,864	27	9	98.76%

== Economic targets and budget ==
The following economic targets were set by the government work report submitted to the NPC:

	2024 target	Result	Ref.
GDP growth	~5%	5%	
CPI	~3%	0.2%	
New urban jobs	12 million	12.56 million	
Deficit-to-GDP ratio	3%		

The NPC session also adopted the following central government budget:

=== Government budget ===
In trillions of renminbi:

	Planned	% change	Actual
Central general public budget revenue	10.243	2.9	10.045
Central general public budget expenditure	14.406	2	14.112
Central government expenditure	4.152	8.6	4.072
Transfer to local governments	10.203	4.1	10.040
Local general public budget revenue	12.153	3.7	11.927
Local general public budget expenditure	24.347	3	24.389
National general public budget revenue	22.395	3.3	21.970
National general public budget expenditure	28.549	4	28.461

=== Central public budget expenditure ===
In billions of renminbi:

	Planned	% change
General public services	158.6	4.5
Diplomacy	60.8	6.6
National defense	1,665.5	7.2
Public security	227.7	1.4
Education	164.9	5
Science and technology	370.8	10
Culture, tourism, sports and media	19.0	10
Social security and employment	117.5	11.6
Health	33.0	11.3
Energy conservation and environmental protection	20.9	7.1
Urban and rural communities	0.4	30.7
Agriculture, forestry and water	27.3	6.5
Transportation	84.8	9.6
Resource exploration and industrial information	44.8	11.1
Commercial services	4.2	39.9
Financial	60.5	15.4
Natural resources, oceanography and meteorology	28.2	–1.4
Housing security	62.3	0.2
Stockpiling grain, edible oils, and other materials	140.6	8.1
Debt interest payments	777.3	11.9
Total	4,152.0	8.6

Preceded by 2023 NPC	Annual National People's Congress Sessions of the People's Republic of China; March 2024	Succeeded by 2025 NPC
