= Brazilian Civil Code =

Brazilian law

The current Brazilian Civil Code (Law 10.406 of January 10, 2002) has been in force since January 11 or 12, 2003, after its one-year vacatio legis. The first version dates from 1916, after the publication of Law No. 3,071 of the same year.

== Structure of the current Code ==
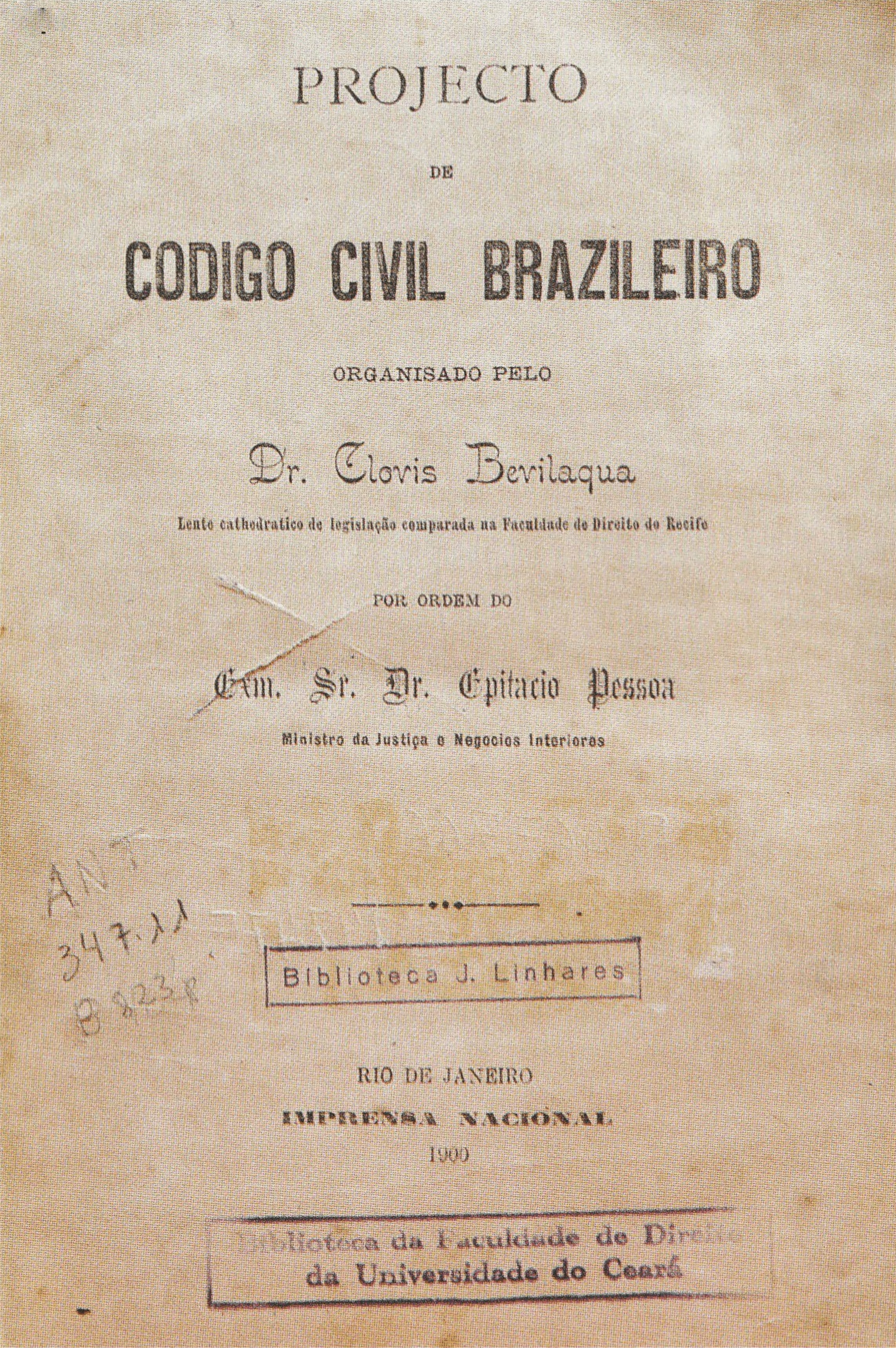
Draft Civil Code, prepared by the jurist Clóvis Beviláqua, printed by the National Press in 1900.

The new text has 2,046 articles organized as follows:

General Part:

- Book I - Persons;
- Book II - Property;
- Book III - Legal Facts;

Special Part:

- Book I - Obligations Law;
- Book II - Commercial Law;
- Book III - Things Law;
- Book IV - Family Law;
- Book V - Succession Law;
- Complementary Book: Final and Transitory Provisions.

== History of the Code ==
=== 1916 Code ===
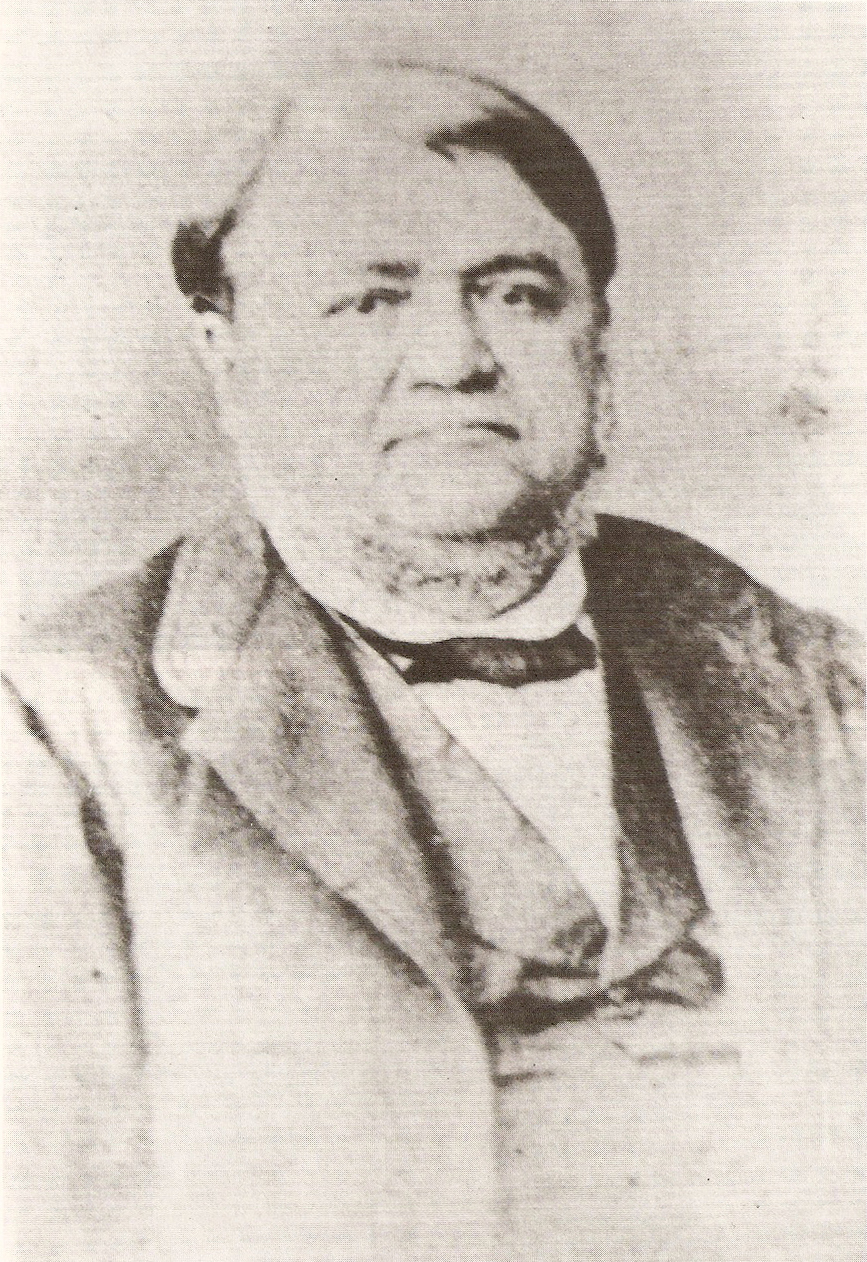
Teixeira de Freitas

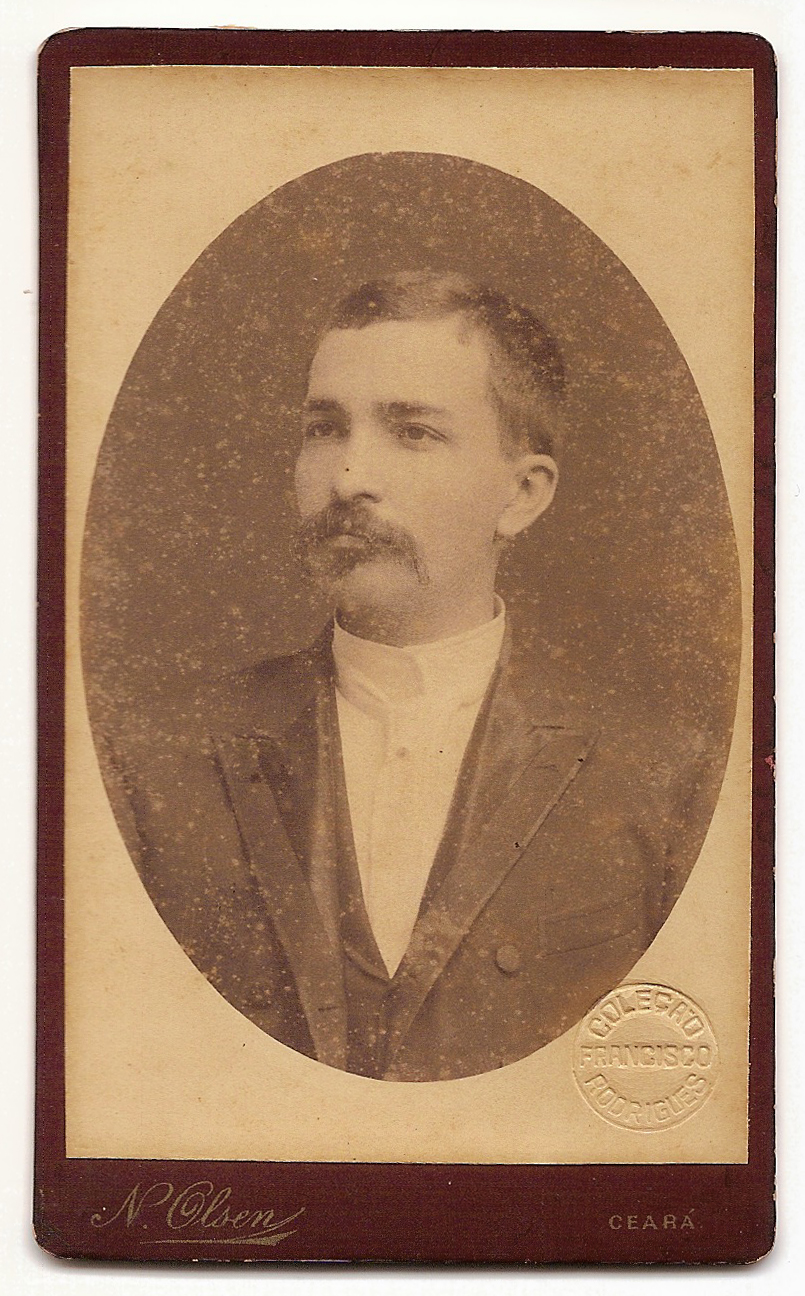
Clóvis Beviláqua.

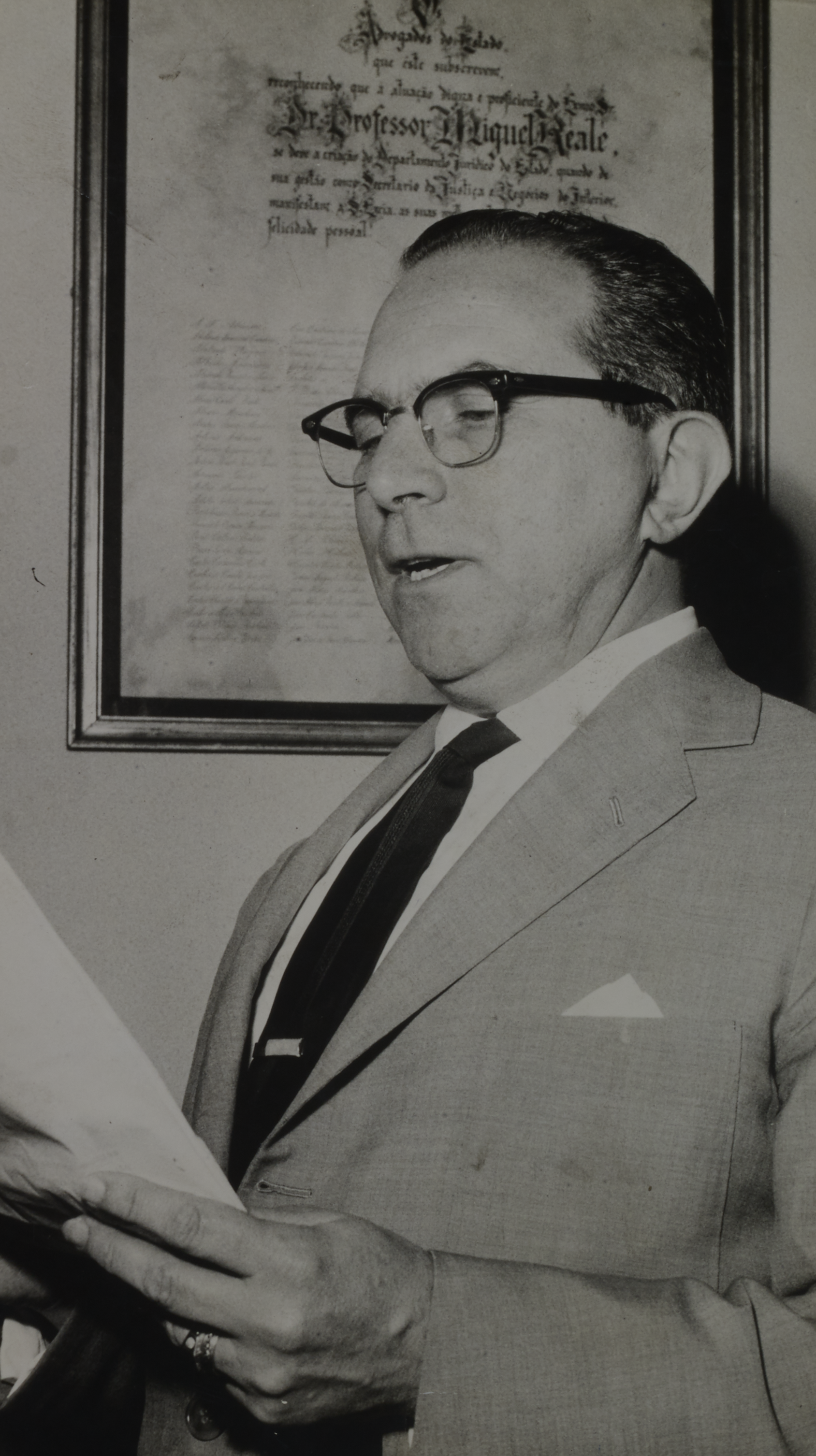
Miguel Reale.

The history of Brazilian law, combined with local elements, is intertwined with the history of Portuguese law, which includes the influence of Roman, Germanic and Canon law. After Brazil's independence, the imperial government enacted a bill to maintain the Philippine Ordinances and all previous Portuguese legislation, which had flaws and contradictions, in force in Brazil. The 1891 constitution required a civil code to be drafted as soon as possible. Consequently, a multitude of laws, assents, charters, resolutions and regulations were issued to complement or modify the Legislations. Once independent, the code needed to develop in accordance with the needs of its people.

The interest aroused by the Napoleonic code and the theory of codification influenced Brazilian jurists, and the creation of the first two law schools in the country and the growing production of national legislation, replacing Portuguese legislation, maintained a steady legal emancipation. The jurist Augusto Teixeira de Freitas was entrusted with the consolidation of the legislation in force and the drafting of the civil code for the Empire. He published his incomplete work and called it a sketch, demonstrating his understanding of the importance of the project and the necessity of a broad discussion. Disgusted by the delay in the commission's review of the project and the silent contempt his work received, Freitas suspended the execution of the contract. However, it is evident the influence his text had on South American codes.

The different attempts made by several Brazilians inspired others, revealing a historical solidarity and a long history of failures and successes. The choice of Clóvis Beviláqua to draft the civil code received a lot of criticism, since the country had more experienced and prestigious jurists. However, he was undeterred, and after numerous modifications made by the commission, his work was completed and approved in the House of Representatives, although much later due to Rui Barbosa's opposition.

The first Civil Code had only 1,807 articles, short and few paragraphs, whose main characteristic were the original and national style. It was more concerned with the precision of the language and concepts rather than the effective practical application of the precepts. It was conservative, especially in its provisions on the family, with a complete rejection of social aspects.

=== 2002 Code ===
The drafting of the 2002 Code was entrusted to Miguel Reale, who invited other jurists to help him. Once the project was completed, it was heavily criticized, as it abdicated the requirement to be a modern law in exchange for comfort and old-fashioned solutions. After amendments, it was approved by the Chamber of Deputies in 1983, but due to the re-democratization of the country and the drafting of the new Constitution, the work was interrupted and fell into oblivion. Abruptly revived, the bill was approved in the Senate and House of Representatives in 2001, and after numerous amendments made to adapt the draft to the new constitutional reality, it was sanctioned by President Fernando Henrique Cardoso in 2002.

An important change in the new code is the unification of civil and commercial law in a single text, the consequence of adherence to the theory of the company, initially adopted by the Italian Civil Code of 1942, promulgated by the fascist government of Benito Mussolini.

== See also ==
- Law of Brazil
- Civil procedure in Brazil
- Civil code
