= Codex Maximilianeus bavaricus civilis =

Bavarian civil code of 1756

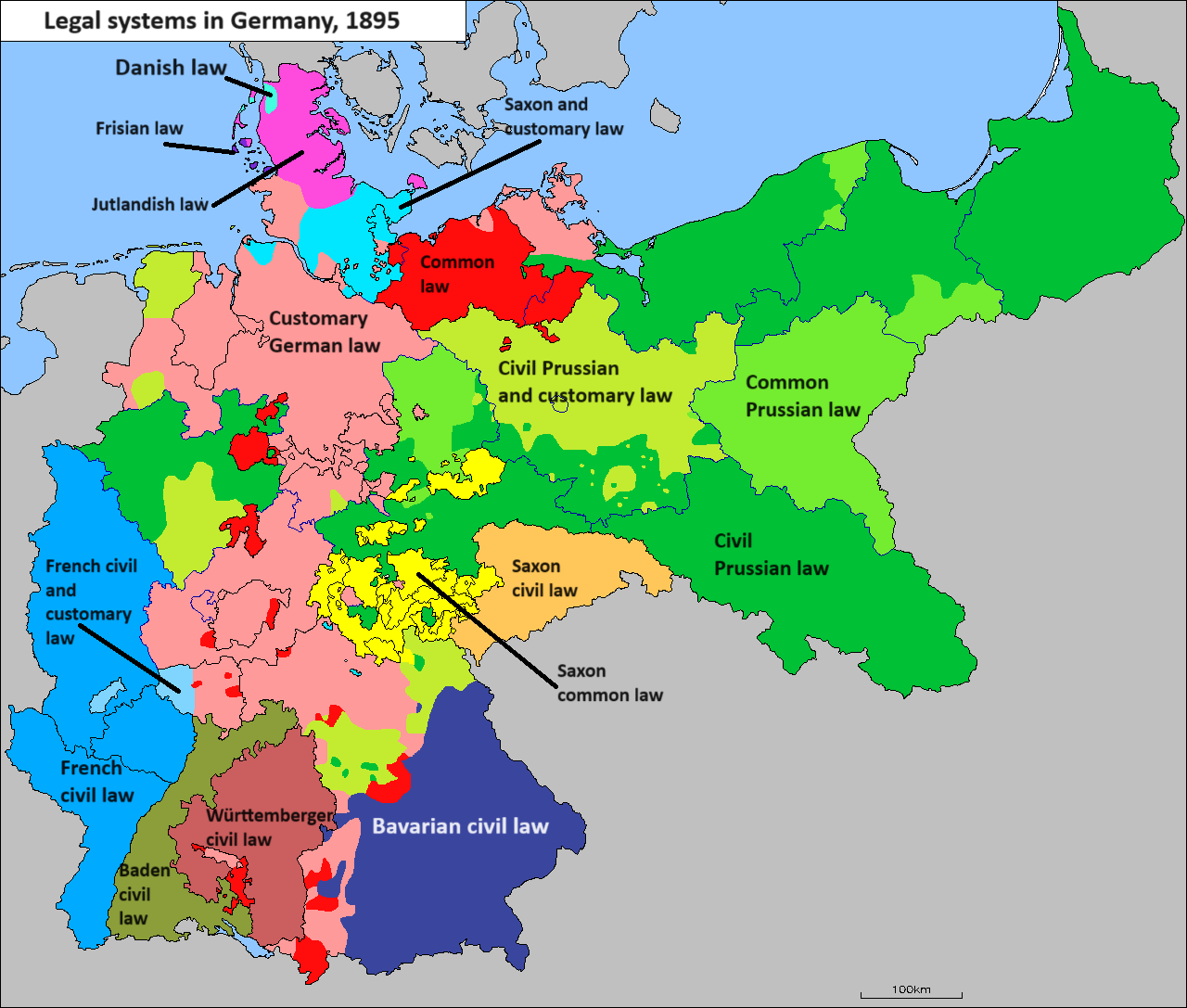
Legal systems in Germany prior to the enactment of the Bürgerliches Gesetzbuch

The Codex Maximilianeus bavaricus civilis was a civil code enacted in the Electorate of Bavaria in 1756. It was drafted entirely by the Bavarian chancellor, Wiguläus von Kreittmayr, and was named after Maximilian III Joseph. Written in German, it nonetheless included many Latin phrases. In its content, it adhered to the Usus modernus Pandectarum more strongly than later codification projects. It remained in force in Bavaria until the enactment of the German Bürgerliches Gesetzbuch (BGB) on January 1, 1900.

== See also ==
- Prussian Allgemeines Landrecht (ALR)
- Napoleonic Code
- Austrian Allgemeines bürgerliches Gesetzbuch (ABGB)
