= Serbian Civil Code =

Serbian civil code (Српски грађански законик)

Civil Code of Serbia
- Territorial extent: Serbia
- Enacted by: State Council, Prince Aleksandar Karađorđević
- Enacted: 6 April 1844
- Effective: 6 April 1844
- Introduced by: Prince Miloš Obrenović, Jovan Hadžić
- Status: Amended

The Serbian Civil Code was the first and only complete civil code in Serbia. It was enacted on 6 April 1844, modeled mostly after the Austrian general civil code, during the reign of the "Defenders of the Constitution" and Prince Aleksandar Karađorđević. It was authored by Habsburg Serb lawyer Jovan Hadžić as the "Civil code for the Principality of Serbia" (Законикъ грађанскій за Княжество Србско), consisting of 950 articles, making it one of the shortest civil codes created. It regulated, among other things, the issues of private property, personal freedom, freedom of contracting, and the equality of parties in civil proceedings and was designed mainly to protect owners of land.

The code is one of the earliest and most important modern Civil law codifications enacted in Europe during the 19th century, after the French (1804), Austrian (1811) and Dutch (1838) codes. It was in force for a whole century, until 1946, which makes it the longest-lasting code in Serbia's recent history. By the Law on the Invalidity of Pre-war Legislation and those enacted during enemy occupation, dated 1946, its use was enabled until the new legislation was adapted. This means that the civil code is applied to this day when it comes to certain legal lacunae.

== History ==
The civil code was enacted for Serbia's need to establish a stable public order, provide legal certainty as well as the need to manage the property law-related relations, as they became complex after the enactment of the Ottoman hatt-i sharifs of 1830 and 1833. It was necessary to establish laws that would support the inviolability of private property. It took a significant amount of time for the code to be enacted because of the absence of certain conditions, including the nation’s general illiteracy, the absence of developed legal theory, and the state of legislative and judicial practice. Although reluctant regarding the idea, due to the significant dissatisfaction of the people, as well as the newly formed situation in Serbia, Prince Miloš Obrenović, during the spring of 1829, named members of the legislative committee, with its mission being to form a Civil law code. Members of the committee, as well as the ones established afterward, were prominent and educated people of their time, although they didn't possess any legal education. Among the mentioned members were Georgije Zaharijades, teacher of Prince Miloš's own sons, to whom the Prince assigned translating a part of the Code civile from German, as well as Vuk Karadžić, Dimitrije Davidović, and others. The committee’s work focused on translating foreign laws, whose content didn't match contemporary Serbia's situation and needs. Afterward, the work on the code temporarily ceased. It was continued in 1834 but to no avail. Due to the lack of the required expertise, no committee managed to fulfill the Prince’s expectations. The task was even avoided and taken involuntarily, as the committee members were aware of their lack of expertise which was required for the undertaking in question. Afterward, Prince Miloš entrusted the creation of the code to respectable lawyer and writer Jovan Hadžić, and the mayor of Zemun, Vasilije Lazarević. Hadžić was the first president of the Matica Srpska.

At the Prince's behest, they were assigned with forming a short compilation of civil law, modeled like the Civil Code of Austria, based on Serbian customary law that would be clear and comprehensible for everyone. Arriving in Serbia in 1837, Hadžić and Lazarević shared the workload, with Hadžić supposed to create a civil code, whilst Lazarević worked on criminal and procedural law codes. The two of them, as soon as they arrived in Serbia, looked through the material relevant to the code so far and created a report for the Prince. They pointed out the inconsistent understanding of property, as well as the injustice when it comes to omitting female children from the hereditary order. However, Lazarević died shortly after, so Hadžić was forced to take on his part of the workload as well.

Due to his active participation in constitution-related battles, Jovan Hadžić ceased his work on the code, which he continued after Prince Miloš abdicated the throne and the mentioned battles were over. Hadžić's draft was inspected by the committee formed alongside the State Council, and, after some slight modifications, it was authorized by Prince Aleksandar and the Council. The Code was proclaimed in 1844, on the Blagovesti Christian holiday. Although enacted on Prince Miloš's initiative, this code was forced by the intelligentsia, as they were dissatisfied with Miloš's absolutism.

Shortly after its enactment, the Serbian civil code was harshly criticized and impugned. The comments and attitudes of most of its critics were negative and some of them were even disparaging. Some of the critics considered Jovan Hadžić a copyist, which is not accurate considering that an undertaking like this would require a notable law education, as well as reasoning, considering it was hard to adapt legal norms to the underdeveloped legal terminology in Serbia. Among the first critics of the Code were Pavle Šeroglić, a Serbian lawyer from Hungary, Dimitrije Matić, a respectable law professor, Giga Geršić, and the first serious remark came from Nikola Krstić, who influenced the Department of Justice enough for them to commence a revision procedure of the code in 1872. Although Krstić presented a draft of a new civil code, the State Council decided that some modifications and additions to Hadžić's code would suffice. Hadžić met harsh criticism at the turn of the century, by the most eminent lawyers – Andra Đorđević and professor Dragoljub Aranđelović, who had translated the Austrian code into Serbian. The latter stated that there was never a worse code enacted in Serbian history, and commenced an initiative for bringing a new code. Živojin Perić and Slobodan Jovanović also advocated for a new codification, viewing Hadžić's code as a shortened Austrian code. Critics were of the opinion that the code didn't suit the needs of the people, nor the political situation. Most objections state that Hadžić contributed to the decomposition of the family cooperative (zadruga), denied heritage rights of the daughter, limited women's business ability, etc. He was criticized for neglecting folk traditions.

The rules of the code were in use for many years after it went out of effect in 1946, until the adoption of separate laws for individual fields of civil law, such as inheritance in 1955, torts and contracts in 1978 and property legal relations in 1980.

== Sources ==
- Avramović, Dr Sima (2014), Srpski građanski zakonik - 170; SRPSKI GRAĐANSKI ZAKONIK (1844) I PRAVNI TRANSPLANTI – KOPIJA AUSTRIJSKOG UZORA ILI VIŠE OD TOGA? (PDF) [Serbian Civil Code - 170; Serbian Civil Code (1844) and Legal Transplants - a copy of the Austrian model or more than that?] (in Serbian), Beograd: Pravni fakultet Univerziteta u Beogradu Centar za izdavaštvo i informisanje
- Krkljuš, Ljubomirka (2015), Pravna istorija srpskog naroda [Legal history of the Serbian people] (in Serbian), Beograd: Pravni fakultet Univerziteta u Beogradu
- Mirković, Zoran (2019), Srpska pravna istorija [Serbian legal history] (in Serbian), Beograd: Pravni fakultet Univerziteta u Beogradu
- Orlić, Dr Miodrag (2014), Srpski građanski zakonik - 170; POKUŠAJI DA SE DONESE NOVI GRAĐANSKI ZAKONIK (PDF) [Serbian Civil Code - 170; Attempts to enact the new civil code] (in Serbian), Beograd: Pravni fakultet Univerziteta u Beogradu Centar za izdavaštvo i informisanje
