= Wiguläus von Kreittmayr =

Bavarian jurist and public official (1705-1790)

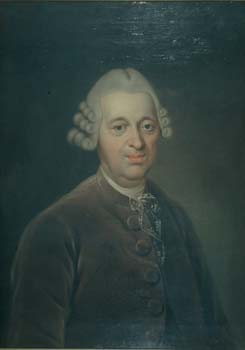
Wiguläus von Kreittmayr, undated portrait

Wiguläus Xaverius Aloysius Kreittmayr, since 1745 Freiherr von Kreittmayr (14 December 1705 – 27 October 1790) was a Bavarian jurist and public official who served as head of the public administration (Wirklicher Geheimer Staatskanzler, state chancellor) of the Electorate of Bavaria since 1758.

Von Kreittmayr's lasting work was as a legislator. A leading member of the Bavarian civil service since 1725, he drafted the Bavarian criminal code (1751), code of civil procedure (1753) and civil code (Codex Maximilianeus bavaricus civilis, 1756). His criminal code, which remained in force until 1813, reflected pre-Enlightenment Catholic views and proved inadequate after the second half of the 18th century. But his civil codifications lasted (although by then very dated) until 1869 and 1900 respectively. His extensive commentaries on Bavarian civil and public law are an important source of legal history and reflect von Kreittmayr's practical and realistic understanding of law.

In 1958, the city of Munich commissioned a bronze statue of von Kreittmayr. But protests by human rights lawyers, who noted that von Kreittmayr's criminal code introduced torture in Bavaria just as other jurisdictions began to abolish it, prevented its installation. The statue was gifted to von Kreittmayr's home village of Offenstetten.
