= Fifth session of the 12th National People's Congress =

2017 National People's Congress; 第十二届全国人民代表大会第五次会议; _{5th plenary session of the}; _{12th National People's Congress}; 5 March – 15 March
President	Premier	Congress Chairman
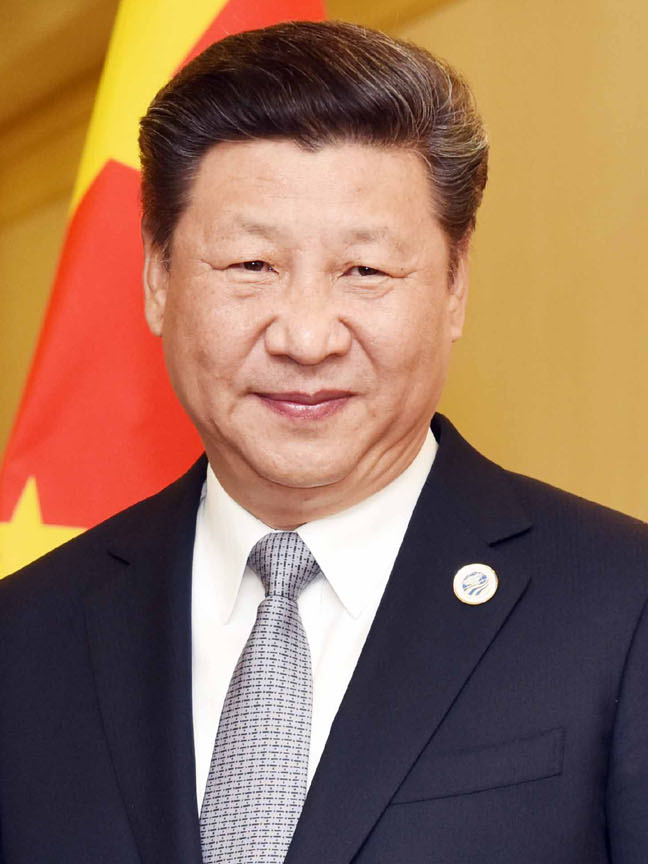
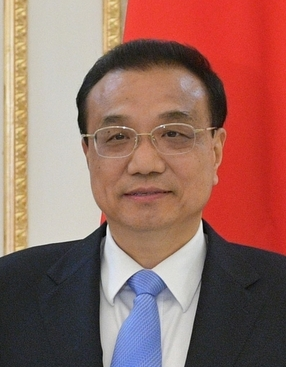
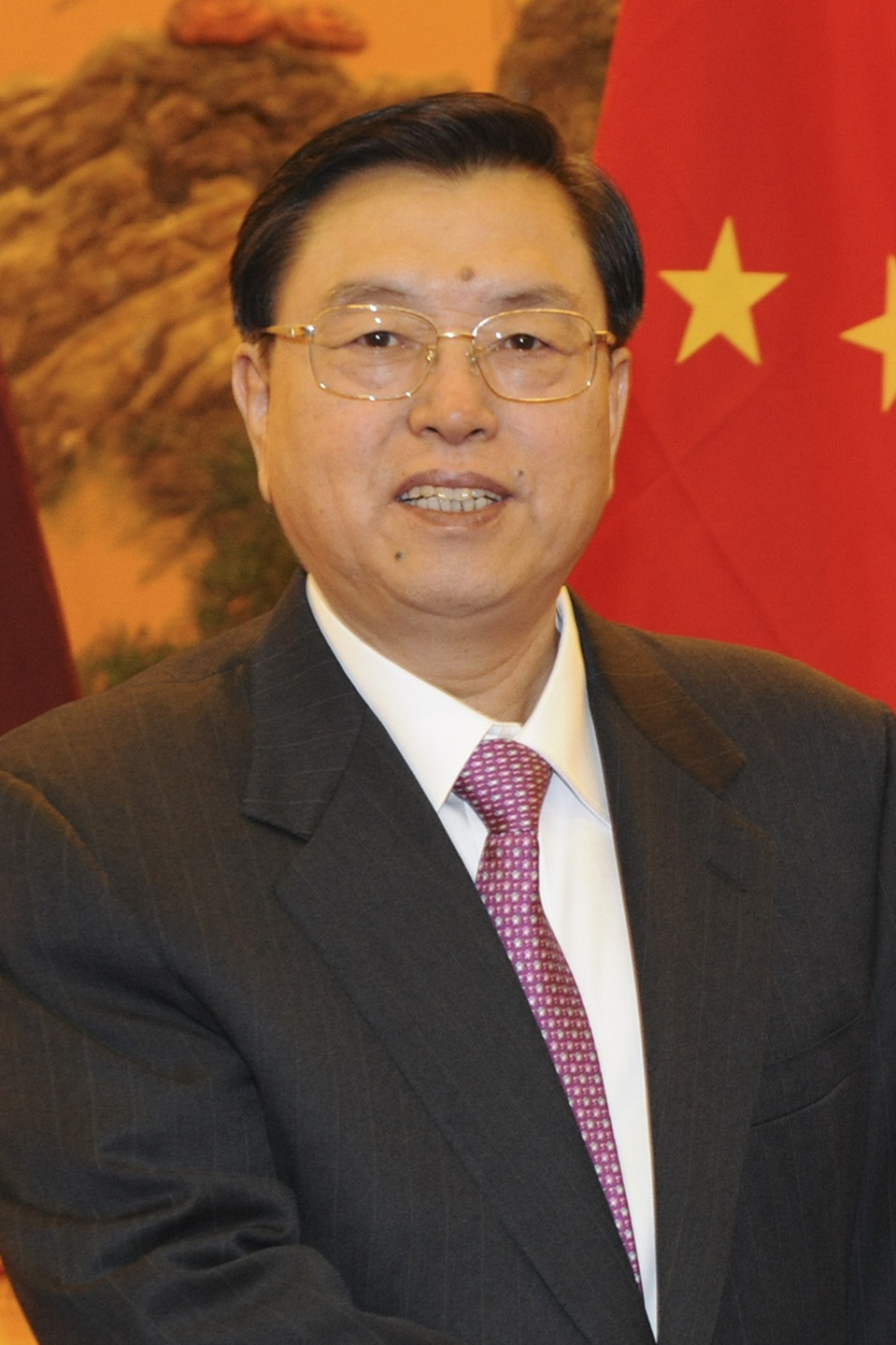
Xi Jinping	Li Keqiang	Zhang Dejiang
since 14 March 2013	since 15 March 2013	since 14 March 2013

The fifth session of the 12th National People's Congress was held in March 2017 at the Great Hall of the People in Beijing, China. It was the last plenary session of the 12th National People's Congress held before elections the next year for the 13th National People's Congress.

== The session ==
At the NPC, Premier Li Keqiang announced an economic growth target of 6.5 percent for next year, the lowest growth target in two decades. Some observers argued that the target was too high yet due to China's growing debt problem, industrial overcapacity and economic maturing.

== Voting results ==
=== Resolutions ===
Topic		For	Against	Abstain	Rate
Premier Li Keqiang's Government Work Report		2,812	14	8	99.22%
General Principles of the Civil Law		2,782	30	21	98.20%
Report on the Implementation of the 2016 National Economic and Social Development Plan and the 2017 Draft Plan		2,721	89	26	95.94%
Report on the Execution of the Central and Local Budgets for 2016 and on the Draft Central and Local Budgets for 2017		2,555	208	71	90.16%
Drafts of electing delegates for the next term	All	2,787	36	13	98.27%
Drafts of electing delegates for the next term	Hong Kong	2,813	13	9	99.22%
Drafts of electing delegates for the next term	Macau	2,811	10	1	99.29%
Chairman Zhang Dejiang's NPCSC Work Report		2,793	24	17	98.55%
Chief Justice Zhou Qiang's Supreme People's Court Work Report		2,606	180	45	91.92%
Procurator-General Cao Jianming's Supreme People's Procuratorate Work Report		2,606	180	46	92.02%
Resignation of Xu Xianming from the NPCSC		2,749	27	47	97.38%
