= Jovan Hadžić =

Serbian writer (1799–1869)

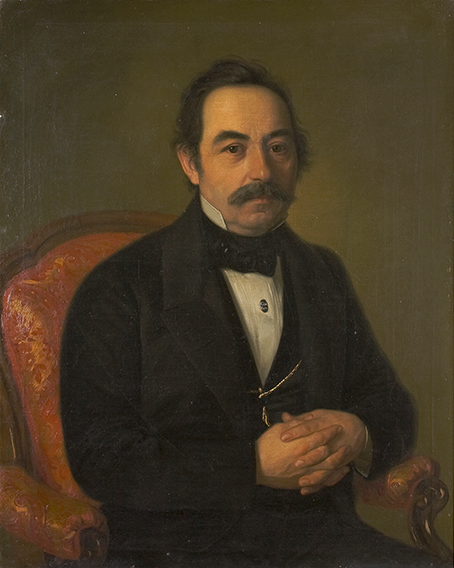
- Portrait of Hadržić by Novak Radonić, 1854
- Born: 8 September 1799; Zombor, Austrian Empire
- Died: 28 April 1869 (aged 69); Újvidék, Austro-Hungary
- Occupations: writer, legislator

Jovan Hadžić (Serbian Cyrillic: Јован Хаџић, pseudonym Miloš Svetić; 8 September 1799 – 28 April 1869) was a Serbian writer, legislator and initiator, that is, the principal co-founder of the Serbian cultural society Matica Srpska. He signed his literary work as Miloš Cvetić and was an influential figure in the drafting of the Civil and Criminal Code of Serbia in 1844. Serbia is the fourth modern-day European country after France, Austria and the Netherlands to have a codified legal system because of Hadžić's work.

Jovan Hadžić is remembered as a founder of the Matica Srpska and as the most persistent opponent of Vuk Karadžić's orthographic reform. However, Hadžić was also a poet and translator, a legislator in the Principality of Serbia, as well as an active public figure. Having established a commendable reputation through his early poetry, many thought he could be a worthy successor to Lukijan Mušicki.

== Biography ==
Jovan Hadžić was born in Zombor on the feast day of Mala Gospojina in 1799 and comes from one of the wealthiest Serb families of Hungary. His parents were father Nikola, a rich Zombor merchant, and mother Sofia (née Petrović). As he was left without parents at an early age, he was taken in 1812 by his uncle, Orthodox bishop Gedeon Petrović of Bačka. He finished primary school in Serbian and then enrolled in German school in Sremski Karlovci. He finished high school with great success and then his interest in writing and poetry began.

Hadžić enrolled in philosophy in Pest, but after three years of study, he gave up and began studying law. While studying philosophy, he was interested in antiquity and the ancient Greek language, and at the Faculty of Law, he distinguished himself as one of the best students of Roman law. This fact largely explains the influences of the original Roman law in the Serbian Civil Code. At that time, Hadžić also began writing poetry under the pseudonym Miloš Svetić. In 1822, he continued his education in Vienna, where he became acquainted with Austrian law. He completed his studies in 1824. During his stay in Vienna, he had the opportunity to meet many great personalities of that time who will have a direct impact on his further work, that is. forming his legal way of thinking. He acquired the title of Doctor of All Rights in 1826, and in 1834 settled at Újvidék (Novi Sad), where he was appointed town senator. He married Marija Desančić in 1829 in Újvidék.

Hadžić arrived in Serbia in 1837, as one of the leading lawyers he was a prominent figure in public life, a participant in political struggles, and an opponent of Prince Miloš Obrenović. He remained in the Serbian principality until 1846, where he proved to be a "born" legislator. He drafted bills based on the Constitution of the Principality of Serbia in 1838. His work is the Serbian Civil Code. He worked on the structure of the Supreme Court of Serbia but did not manage to complete the Code of Judicial Procedure. He contributed to the improvement of the position of state and court officials.

In Újvidék, in 1847, he was elected a member of the Hungarian Parliament in Pozsony (Bratislava). He was twice summoned in 1848 as a ministerial adviser at the Ministry of Justice in Pest. After the Hungarian revolution, judicial organizations in the Serbian Voivodeship had to be accepted. After resigning in 1850, he became president of the District Court in Újvidék until 1854, when he retired.

He was a free manager for 19 years and was the patron of the Great Serbian Gymnasium in Újvidék until his death. He helped the then gifted high school student Svetozar Miletić to receive a scholarship of 100 pounds from bishop Josif Rajačić.

He was also an important person in Serb cultural work. In 1826, he was the founder and the first president of Matica Srpska, the editor of Letopis ("the Chronicle") and initially an associate of Vuk Karadžić. However, in the mid-1930s, he came into conflict with Karadžić over the Serbian literary language. Hadžić is considered to be Karadžić's greatest opponent, but in 1866 he allowed himself to be taught according to Karadžić's and Đura Daničić's spelling, and Old Slavonic according to Franz Miklosich, at the Great Serbian Gymnasium in Újvidék, where he was the school principal later in life.

Jovan Hadžić died in April 1869 and was buried in Újvidék, in front of the gate of the St. John's Church, where his widow erected a monument to him.

== Work ==
Hadžić's literary and scientific work is extensive. Apart from law, he also dealt with poetry, translation, history, and philology. Jovan Hadzić was a student of Lukijan Musicki and his successor. As a poet, he is at the crossroads of the old classicism of Lukijan Mušicki towards newer poetic aspirations whose stimuli came from German literature and our folk poetry. Following the example of his teacher, Hadžić wrote an ode to the glory of prominent contemporaries, patriotic, didactic songs, and showed great interest in political and epic poetry. In his political songs, there is a sense of appropriate, public, current, so that the songs get a distinctly personal tone. Since he was an active participant in the political scene, he speaks about everything openly and engaged. His famous epic poem written in hexameter is The First Crossing of Black George from Serbia to Srem. Karadjordje is also the subject of his main historiographical work, The Serbian Uprising under Black George (1862).

Jovan Hadžić also worked as a translator. He translated works of the ancient and modern classical tradition: Homer, Virgil, Horace, Friedrich Schiller, Goethe, and many others. He translated parts from the Iliad in the ten, and he translated Horace's Poetic Art in two meters, in parallel, in the meter of the original, and in the epic ten. It is from this that we see that his interest was diverse and versatile.

Hadžić was the editor of the first Serbian Civil Code, which was passed in 1844, and with him, he compiled several accompanying laws and legal acts.

== Serbian language reform ==
Jovan Hadžić was one of the most prominent opponents of Karadžić's language reform. He stood out the most after the death of Metropolitan Stefan Stratimirović in 1836. In 1837, Hadžić published his booklet on linguistics, Sitnice jezikoslovne, which prompted Karadžić and his supporters to enter a public showdown with him, believing that Hadžić's linguistic model could not serve as a basis. That conflict existed until 1847 when Karadžić succeeded in his idea of making the vernacular the literary language. The conflict between Karadžić and Hadžić finally ended with the intervention of Đuro Daničić (1825—1882), who in his work War for the Serbian Language and Spelling argumented against using the old alphabet and spelling, and pointed out Hadžić's incompetence in philology, which was crucial in defeating Hadžić and his followers. While opponents to Karadžić's reform continued to use the old model, the young generation of intellectuals supported Karadžić.

Today, we find far more negative than positive criticism of Jovan Hadžić's work. The reason for that may be the failure in the conflict with Vuk Karadžić. However, the justification for such an attitude of Hadžić can be found in the influence that his schooling in Habsburg monarchy had on him, but that does not justify him on the philological level. His literary work is, of course, very important in the Serbian literature of the 19th century, but his conservative ideas, which disrupted the attempts to advance in the language at the time, were the ones that somewhat prevented his success in philology.

== Selected works ==
- Sud u grammatiki Vekoslava Babukića, 1838
- Golubica s cvetom knižestva srbskog, 1839
- Vukov odgovor na Utuk, 1843
- Utuk 2 ili odgovor na Vukov odgovor, 1844
- Izstupleniia M. Svetića u Utuk II, 1845

== Sources ==
- Jovan Skerlić, Istrorija nove srpske knjizevnosti (Belgrade, 1914, 1921) pages 189-192.

Cultural offices
Preceded by Post established	President of Matica Srpska; 1826–???	Succeeded by Mihailo Jovanović
