= Criminal Code of the Republic of China =

The Criminal Code of the Republic of China is the fundamental criminal law of the Republic of China (ROC). Commonly referred to as the "general criminal law", the Code is divided into two main sections: general provisions and specific provisions.

This Code is a type of substantive law (as opposed to procedural law), defining the substantive conditions under which the state exercises its criminal authority. It also functions as a general law (as opposed to special law), meaning that in cases where other laws contain specific provisions on the same matters, the provisions of those other laws shall take precedence. In principle, the general provisions of the Criminal Code apply to all criminal statutes in the laws of the Republic of China. Criminal provisions found in other laws are typically referred to as subsidiary criminal laws. The specific provisions of the Code enumerate the primary categories of criminal offenses and their corresponding punishments.

== History ==
March 10, 1912, the first year of the Republic of China calendar, President Yuan Shikai promulgated the Provisional New Criminal Law, which became the first criminal code enacted following the establishment of the Republic of China.

The current criminal law in use is officially titled the Criminal Code (commonly referred to simply as the "Criminal Law"). It was preceded by an earlier version enacted on September 1, 1917, which is now commonly referred to as the Old Criminal Code.

In 2019, the Supreme Court of Republic of China, in its Appeal 334, ruled that the Criminal Code still has jurisdiction over crimes committed in mainland China despite Taiwan's current lack of sovereignty over mainland China.

== Contents ==
=== General Provisions ===
The general provisions of the criminal law are generally divided into the theory of crime, the theory of competition the theory of punishment: the theory of crime deals with determining whether the criminal's behavior meets the legal requirements of the crime, the theory of punishment explores the legal effect of what kind of sanctions should be imposed according to law, and the theory of competition is the bridge between the two, clarifying the relationship between "crime and crime" and "punishment and punishment."

The content of the theory of crime generally includes the appropriateness of the constituent ⁣⁣wrongdoing⁣⁣, Guilt (law), the stages of the crime (preparation, attempt, completion), principal offender and accomplice, action and inaction, etc.

The theory of criminal punishment mainly includes the types, application and execution of criminal punishment and security measures. Please refer to Criminal punishment and Security measures (law).

=== Specific Provisions ===
Common categories include Homicide, Assault, Theft, Robbery, Fraud, Corruption, Treason, and offenses related to public safety and national security.

== See also ==
- Crime science
- Six Codes
