= Jacques de Maleville =

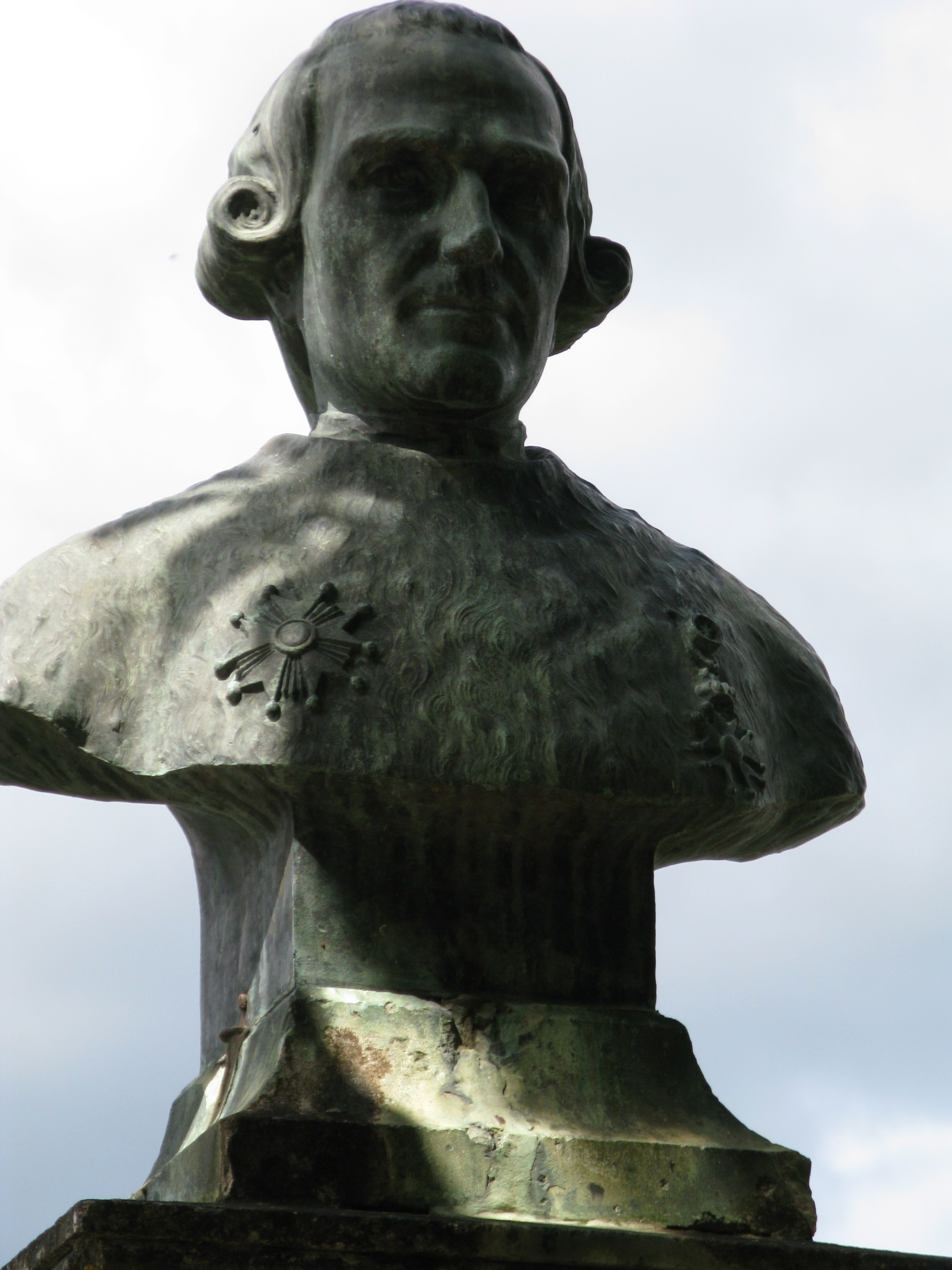
Bust of Jacques de Maleville in Domme.

Jacques de Maleville (19 June 1741- 22 November 1824) was a French jurist and politician and one of the main contributors to the Napoleonic Code.

== Biography ==
Jacques de Maleville was born on the 19th of June, 1741 to middle class merchant Pierre Maleville and Louise Anne Molène of Domme, Dordogne. Jacques de Maleville was married on the 5th of July, 1773 to Pauline Lafaye and had seven children.

In 1789 he became lawyer in the city Bordeaux and by 1790 he was appointed as the president of the directory of Dordogne and then in 1791 a judge of the Court of Cassation (A role he would leave in 1795 and assume again in 1799 after serving on the Council of Elders for four years).

Maleville became editor-in-chief for the creation of the Napoleonic Code; he along with Jean-Étienne-Marie Portalis became the strongest advocates against customary law in favor of civil law, ultimately resulting in the outright rejection of customary law in France.

He was later granted the title of "Baron of the Empire" in 1808. In 1815 he was awarded the Legion of Honour by Louis XVIII.

== Works ==
- Maleville, Jacques de, 1741-1824: Analyse raisonnée de la discussion du Code civil au Conseil d'État, contenant le texte des lois le précis des observations faites sur chaque article, et les motifs de la décision du Conseil; l'indication de la conformité et de l'opposition de ces articles aux lois anciennes; les arrêts rendus par la Cour de cassation, pour en fixer le sens; et les observations particulières de l'auteur, pour concilier et rectifier quelques-uns de ces articles, et faciliter l'intelligence des autres (Nève, 1822)
- Maleville, Jacques de, 1741-1824: Analyse raisonnée de la discussion du Code civil au Conseil d'État : contenant le texte des lois : le précis des observations faites sur chaque article, et les motifs de la décision du Conseil : l'indication de la conformité et de l'opposition de ces articles aux lois anciennes : les arrêts rendus par la cour de cassation, pour en fixer le sens et les observations particuliêres de l'auteur ... (Garnery [etc.], 1807)
