= Cuban civil code =

Law 59 or the Cuban civil code is the legal body that regulates the main norms in legal matters such as Real Rights, Law of obligations, Contract law and inheritance law, in addition to the legal capacity of persons, natural and law, and some rules of Private International Law in the Republic of Cuba. It has four books and a few articles about principles of civil law.

The National Assembly of People's Power passed the law in 1987. The previous code in force was the Spanish Civil Code. Since Cuba was one of the last colonies of Spain in America, it did not have the experience of make its own Civil Code until the second half of the twentieth century, contrary to what many Latin American nations did throughout the 19th century. The Spanish Code was ratified by the proclamation of January 1, 1899 of the United States Military Government intervening in the Island.

The first 10 articles of the Civil Code determine a set of legal principles guiding the Law. The title of the first book is "Legal relation", and article 23 mentions the elements that comprise the Law, which are: the subjects that intervene in it, the object and the cause that generates it. The Second Book is titled "Property Rights" Article 129.1 states that "Ownership confers on the owner the possession, use, enjoyment and disposition of the goods, according to their socio-economic destiny". The "Rights of obligations and contracts" is the title of the Third Book of the Code. The last book of the Code is entitled "Law of Succession". Article 466 introduces the subject stating the following: "The right of succession comprises the set of rules that regulate the transfer of the estate of the deceased after his death."
