= Les cinq codes =

Les cinq codes (English: the five codes) was a set of legal codes established under Napoléon I between 1804 and 1810:

- Code civil (1804), the first and best known
- Code de procédure civile (1806)
- Code de commerce (1807)
- Code d’instruction criminelle (1808)
- Code pénal (1810).
