= Félix-Julien-Jean Bigot de Préameneu =

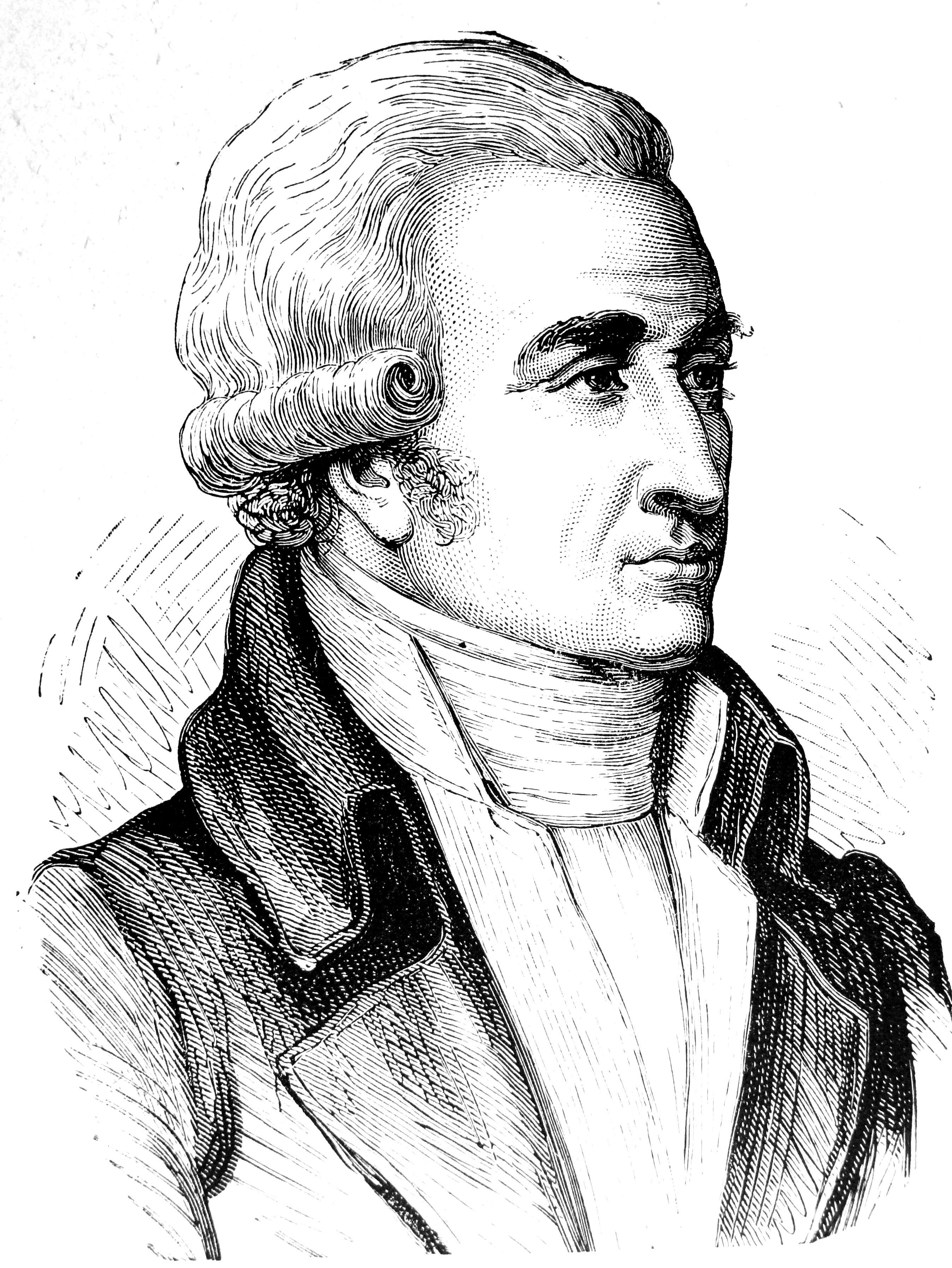
Bigot de Préameneu (Album du Centenaire)

Félix Julien Jean Bigot de Préameneu (French: [feliks ʒyljɛ̃ ʒɑ̃ biɡo də pʁeamnø]; 26 March 1747 – 31 July 1825) was one of the four legal authors of the Napoleonic Code written at the request of Napoleon at the beginning of the nineteenth century.

== Biography ==
Bigot de Préameneu was a lawyer for the Parlement of Rennes, then to the Parlement of Paris before the revolution, and was also a member of the Legislative Assembly in 1791.

He professed moderate opinions and was among the defenders of Louis XVI, but he departed from parliamentary politics after the Commune, becoming a judge under the National Constituent Assembly and the Directory.

Under the Consulate, he was appointed government commissioner by the supreme court. In 1802, he was appointed as legislative president of the Council of State and was one of the four jurist authors of the Code Napoleon, led by Cambacérès and instigated by Napoleon I of France in 1800.

In 1803, he was elected to the Académie française. In 1808, he replaced Portalis as Minister of Public Worship. He was made a count of the empire on 24 April 1808, and became a peer of France during the Hundred Days.

He married Eulalie Marie Renée Barbier, daughter of Aimé Francois Barbier and Jeanne Dufour.

Bigot lost all his responsibilities at the beginning of the second Restoration. He died on 31 July 1825 in Paris and is buried in Père Lachaise Cemetery (14th division).

He is briefly mentioned in the Victor Hugo novel Les Misérables as the recipient of an angry letter regarding Bishop Myriel.

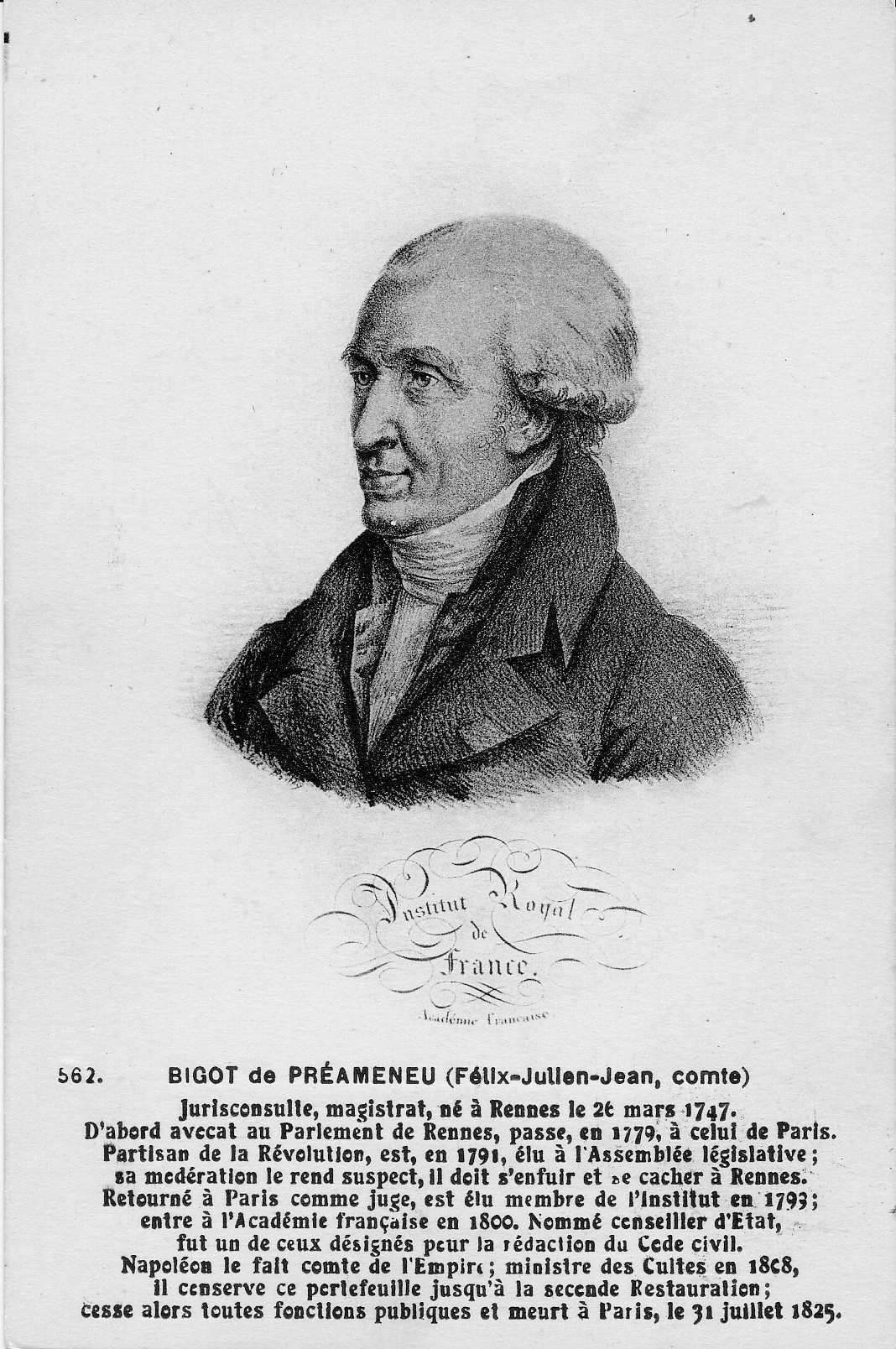
Portrait of Bigot de Préameneu

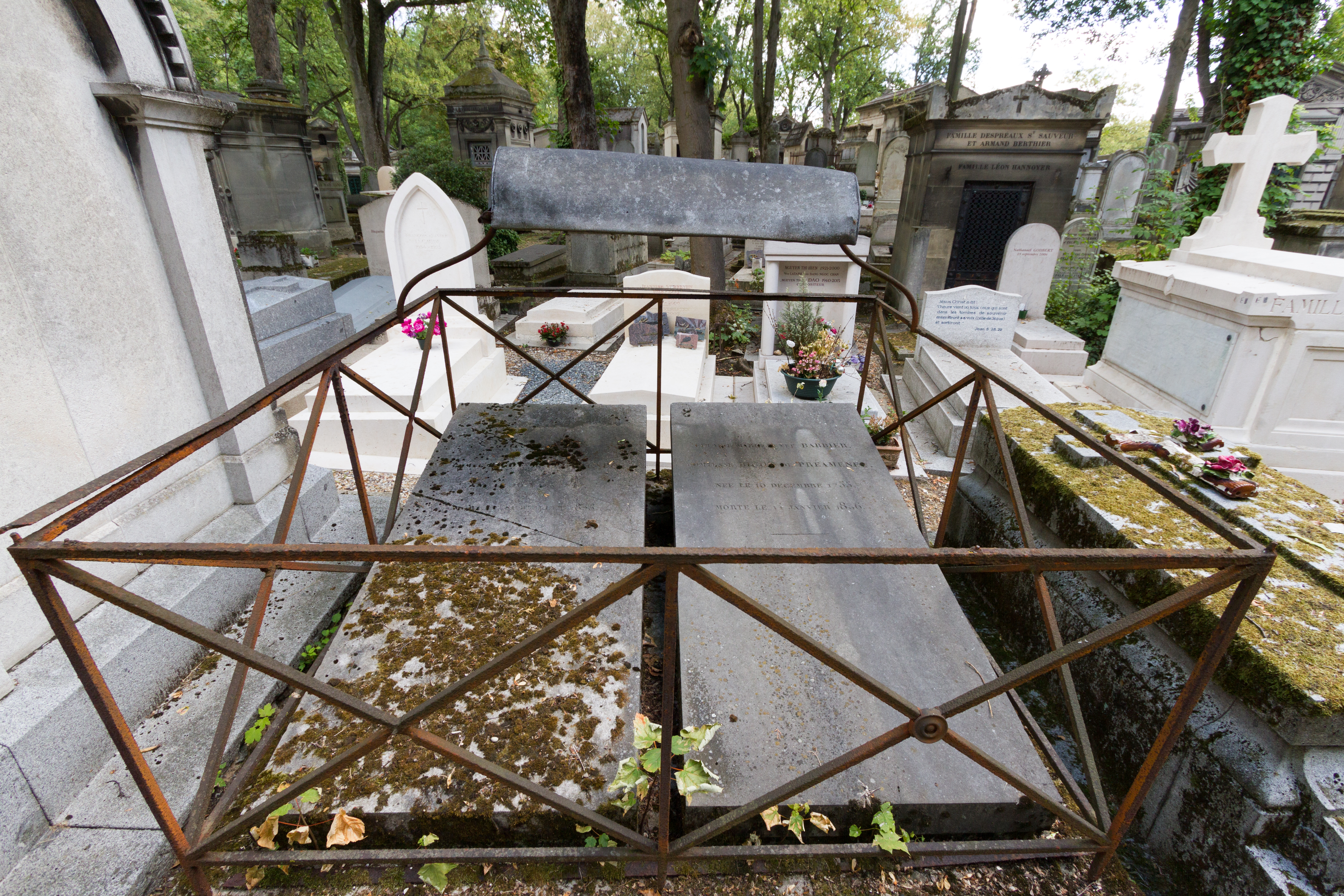
Tomb of Félix Julien Jean Bigot de Préameneu in Père Lachaise Cemetery
