= West Galician Code =

The West Galician code (also The civil code of Western Galicia, German: Westgalizisches Gesetzbuch, rarely — Bürgerliches Gesetzbuch von Westgalizien) was a civil code created in the 18th century. Karl Anton Freiherr von Martini was the leading drafter. The code was introduced in West Galicia, an administrative region of the Habsburg monarchy, created after the Third Partition of Poland, prior to the introduction of ABGB, the civil code of Austria. It contained little in the way of solving feudal-class problems, but was based on the ideals of freedom and equality before the law shaped by natural law.

== Publications of the Code ==
- Codex civilis pro Galicia occidentali. — Wien, 1797. (In Latin)
