= National debt of China =

National debt of the People's Republic of China

The national debt (Note: The term "national debt" typically refers to direct liabilities of the Government. There are several different concepts of debt that are at various times used to refer to the national debt: "Public debt" is defined as public debt securities issued by the Government. "Debt held by the public" measures the cumulative amount outstanding that the government has borrowed to finance deficits. See: FAQ, U.S. Department of the Treasury) (or government debt) of the People's Republic of China is the total amount of money owed by the central government, local governments, government branches and state organizations of China. According to the International Monetary Fund, general government debt amounted to 77% of GDP in 2022. Large-scale infrastructure construction in China has been debt-financed through the use of local government financing vehicles (LGFVs) that borrow from banks and issue corporate bonds known as "urban construction and investment bonds" or "chengtou" bonds.

Standard & Poor's Global Ratings has stated Chinese local governments may have an additional CN¥ 40 trillion ($5.8 trillion) in off-balance sheet debt. Debt owed by state-owned industrial firms is another 74% of GDP according to the International Monetary Fund. The three government-owned banks (China Development Bank, Agricultural Development Bank of China and Exim Bank of China) owe a further 29% of GDP. China's debt level increased during the 2010s, continuing as an economic issue into the 2020s.

== Purpose of debt ==
The main purpose of Chinese debt has been to fund large-scale infrastructure construction and urbanization, primarily through the use of local government financing vehicles (LGFV) which issue corporate bonds known as "urban construction and investment bonds" ("chengtou" bonds). China's economic growth and rapid urban development after the 2008 financial crisis was in part driven by booming credit.

== Size ==
The International Monetary Fund, the Federal Reserve Bank of St. Louis and other sources, such as the Article IV Consultation Reports, (Note: An "Article IV consultation" is a "regular, usually annual, comprehensive discussion" between IMF staff and representatives of individual member-countries concerning the member's economic and financial policies, conducted on the basis of Article IV of the IMF Articles of Agreement. See: IMF Glossary) state that, at the end of 2014, the "general government gross debt"-to-GDP ratio for China was 41.54 percent. With China's 2014 GDP being US$ 10,356.508 billion, this makes the government debt of China approximately US$ 4.3 trillion.

The foreign debt of China, by June 2015, stood at around US$ 1.68 trillion, according to data from the country's State Administration of Foreign Exchange (SAFE) as quoted by the State Council. The figure excludes the Special Administrative Regions of Hong Kong and Macau. Chinese foreign debt denominated in the U.S. dollar was 80 percent of the total, euros 6 percent, and Japanese yen 4 percent. Per SAFE's 2019 balance of payments report, the external debt balance of the entire Chinese government at year end was 2% of GDP.

In 2023, aggregate local government debt had risen to 92 trillion yuan ($12.58 trillion) and the central government of People's Republic of China ordered its banks to roll over debts in a debt-restructuring. China's gross external debt in 2023 was $2.38 trillion.

== Issues and concerns ==
By the mid-2010s, many analysts had expressed concern about the overall "size" of the Chinese government debt. An IMF working paper, published in 2015, states that "financial sector reforms in China are progressing at an uneven pace", adding that "progress in removing implicit state guarantees has been slower." This, according to the IMF paper, means that "with implicit state guarantees still in place, banks have little incentives to seek better projects and correctly price risk."

A 2015 International Monetary Fund report concluded that China's public debt is relatively low "and on a stable path in all standard stress tests except for the scenario with contingent liability shocks," such as "a large-scale bank recapitalization or financial system bailout to deal, for example, with a potential rise in NPLs from deleveraging."

Shadow banking has risen in China, posing risks to the financial system.

Chinese authorities have dismissed analysts' worries, insisting that "the country still has room to increase government debt." Finance Minister Lou Jiwei stated that China's "fiscal income is in a severe situation," yet the government "need[s] to expand the fiscal deficit, but it is hard to say how much room is appropriate."

Former Federal Reserve System Chairman Ben Bernanke, earlier in 2016, commented that "the...debt pile facing China [is] an 'internal' problem, given the majority of the borrowings was issued in local currency." Many economists have expressed the same views, dismissing worries over the size of Chinese government debt, either in absolute terms or in proportion to the nation's GDP, as "nonsensical". Amidst the China-U.S. trade war, economists underline that persistent issues in China's economic structure may further curtail growth, and have led to new benchmarks of high debt-to GDP ratios in 2020 and in 2022.

== Local and provincial debt ==
By 2015, local government entities owed a total of about 18 trillion yuan (about one-third of China's economy), mostly to state-owned banks who had made loans to the local governments "to fund risky land and property deals." The Chinese central government authorized provinces to issue at least 2.6 trillion yuan ($419 billion) in bonds in 2015 in order to stabilize the financial system. However, demand for provincial bonds from the private market was weak due to inadequate yields, and in May 2015, the central government directed state-owned lenders to buy the local bonds, creating a debt swap akin to a bailout.

In 2022, China's 31 provincial governments had a stockpile of outstanding bonds that's close to the Ministry of Finance's risk threshold of 120% of income and face a maturity wall over the next five years as bonds worth almost 15 trillion yuan ($2.1 trillion) - more than 40% of their outstanding debt - fall due.

By 2023, national debt owed by local governments totaled 92 trillion yuan or 76% of People's Republic of China's reported economic output in 2022.

== History ==
In 1965, China paid off all its foreign debt.

From 1966 to 1978, China did not have foreign debt or domestic debt. During this period, it issued money to finance budget deficits when necessary.

From the period 1979 to 1993, the government began to borrow from both international and domestic sources. The amount borrowed during this period was relatively small. After 1994, domestic borrowing increased and foreign borrowing decreased.

In 1998, China took an expansionary approach to fiscal policy and its budgets were in deficit.

== See also ==
- Economy of China
- Foreign exchange reserves of China
