= Napoleonic Code =

French civil code established in 1804

Civil Code of the French Code civil des Français
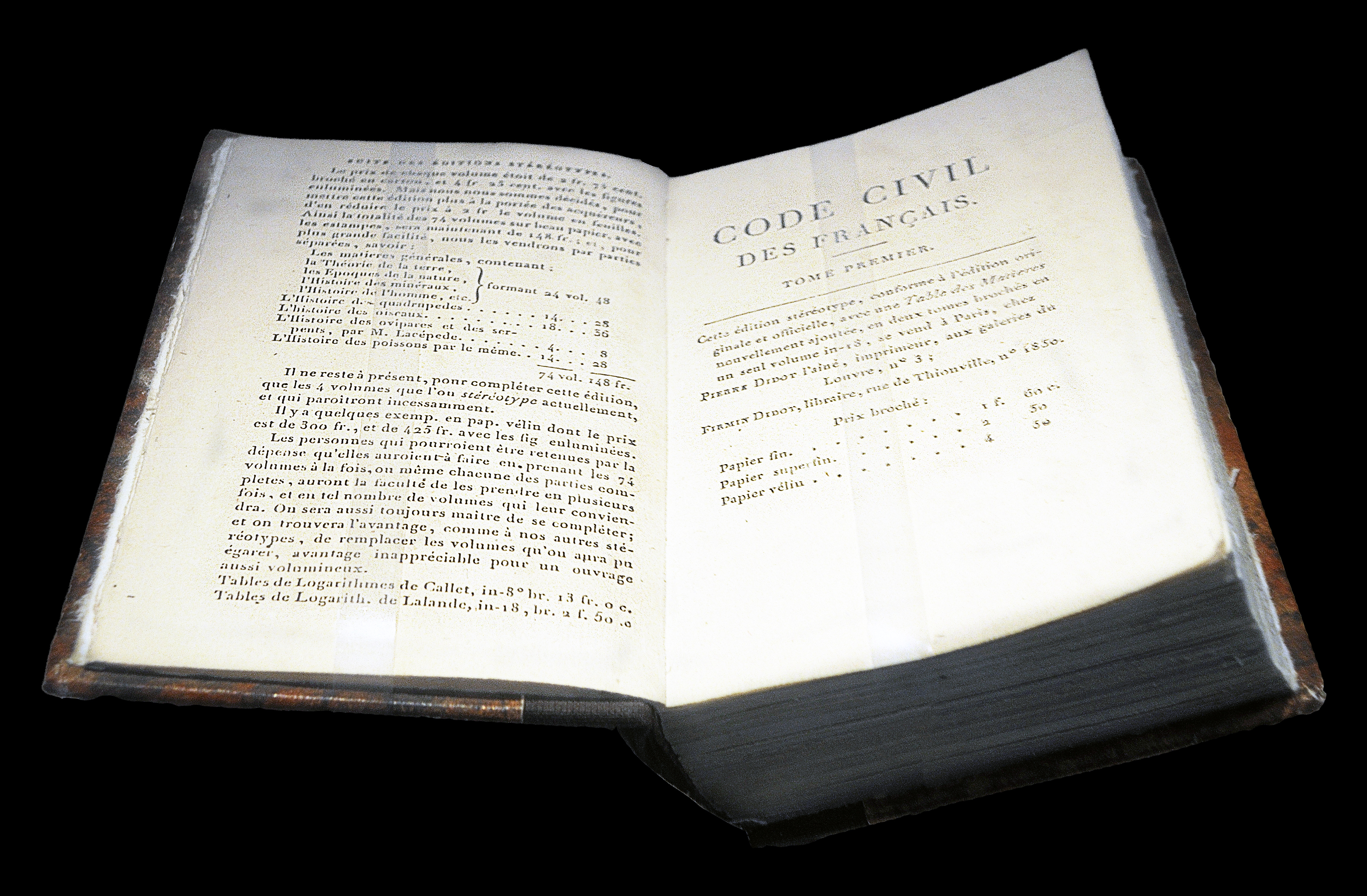
- The Napoleonic Code in the Historical Museum of the Palatinate in Speyer

Legislature of the French Consulate
- Citation: Code civil
- Territorial extent: France
- Enacted by: Corps législatif
- Signed by: First Consul Napoleon Bonaparte
- Effective: 21 March 1804
- Introduced by: Jacques de Maleville; Jean Portalis; Félix Bigot de Préameneu; François Tronchet

Repeals
- Civil Code of the French Republic (1803)

Amended by
- Law 2019–2022 on 1 September 2020
- Status: Amended

The Napoleonic Code (French: Code Napoléon), officially the Civil Code of the French (French: Code civil des Français; simply referred to as Code civil), is the French civil code established during the French Consulate in 1804 and still in force in France, although heavily and frequently amended since its inception. Although Napoleon himself was not directly involved in the drafting of the Code, as it was drafted by a commission of four eminent jurists, he chaired many of the commission's plenary sessions, and his support was crucial to its enactment.

The code, with its stress on clearly written and accessible law, was a major milestone in the abolition of the previous patchwork of feudal laws. Historian Robert Holtman regards it as one of the few documents that have influenced the whole world. The Napoleonic Code was not the first legal code to be established in a European country with a civil-law legal system; it was preceded by the Codex Maximilianeus bavaricus civilis (Bavaria, 1756), the Allgemeines Landrecht (Prussia, 1794), and the West Galician Code (Galicia, then part of Austria, 1797). It was, however, the first modern legal code to be adopted with a pan-European scope, and it strongly influenced the law of many of the countries formed during and after the Napoleonic Wars. The Napoleonic Code influenced developing countries outside Europe attempting to modernize and defeudalize their countries through legal reforms, such as those in the Middle East, while in Latin America the Spanish and Portuguese had established their own versions of the civil code.

== History ==
The categories of the Napoleonic Code were not drawn from earlier French law, but instead from Justinian's sixth-century codification of Roman law, the Corpus Juris Civilis, and within it, the Institutes. The Institutes divide into the law of:

1. persons
2. things
3. actions.

Similarly, the Napoleonic Code divided the law into four sections:

1. persons
2. property
3. acquisition of property
4. civil procedure (moved into a separate code in 1806).

=== Prior codification attempts ===
Before the Napoleonic Code, France did not have a single set of laws; law consisted mainly of local customs, sometimes officially compiled in "custumals" (coutumes), notably the Custom of Paris. There were also exemptions, privileges, and special charters granted by kings or other feudal lords. With the Revolution, the last vestiges of feudalism were abolished.

Specifically, as to civil law, the many different bodies of law used in different parts of France were to be replaced by a single legal code. The Constituent Assembly on 5 October 1790 voted for a codification of French laws, the Constitution of 1791 promised one, and the National Assembly adopted a unanimous resolution on 4 September 1791 providing that "there shall be a code of civil laws common for the entire realm." However, it was the National Convention in 1793 which established a special commission headed by Jean-Jacques-Régis de Cambacérès to oversee the drafting process.

His drafts of 1793 (for which Cambacérès had been given a one month deadline), 1794, and 1796 were all rejected by a National Convention and the French Directory of the time was more preoccupied with the turmoil resulting from various wars and strife with other European powers. The first draft contained 719 articles and was very revolutionary, but was rejected for being too technical and criticized for not being radical or philosophical enough. The second, with only 297 articles, was rejected for being too brief and was criticized for being a mere manual of morals. The third, expanded to 1,104 articles, was presented under the conservative Directory regime, but never even came up for discussion.

Another commission, established in December 1799 established a fourth outline drafted in part by Jean-Ignace Jacqueminot (1754–1813). Jacqueminot's draft, the so-called loi Jacqueminot, dealt almost exclusively with persons and emphasized the need to reform the divorce laws, to strengthen parental authority and increase the testator's freedom to dispose of the free portion of his estate. It was rejected.

=== Napoleonic reforms ===
Napoleon's victory at the Battle of Marengo allowed him to consolidate his power in France. Returning to Paris, he appointed on 12 August 1800 a commission of distinguished jurists and politicians, including Jacques de Maleville, François Denis Tronchet, Félix-Julien-Jean Bigot de Préameneu, Jean-Étienne-Marie Portalis to draft a civil code. For this commission, Cambacérès (now Second Consul), and Napoleon himself chaired the plenary sessions. After this process finished, the Code was sent to the Legislative Body as a preliminary bill in December 1801, where it was rejected by a vote of 142 to 139. In response, Napoleon announced on 2 January 1802 that he was suspending all projects, effectively closing the assemblies' sessions; simultaneously, he went to the Sénat conservateur to berate its members. These tactics cowed the legislature into submission, and gave Napoleon the majority he needed. The code finally came into effect on 21 March 1804.

The process developed mainly out of the various customs, but was inspired by Justinian's sixth-century codification of Roman law, the Corpus Juris Civilis and, within that, Justinian's Code (Codex). The Napoleonic Code, however, differed from Justinian's in important ways:

- It incorporated all kinds of earlier rules, not just legislation
- It was not a collection of edited extracts, but a comprehensive rewrite
- Its structure was much more rational
- It had no religious content
- It was written in the vernacular

The Napoleonic Code marked a fundamental change in the nature of the civil law legal system, making laws clearer and more accessible. It also superseded the former conflict between royal legislative power and, particularly in the final years before the Revolution, protests by judges representing views and privileges of the social classes to which they belonged. Such conflict led the Revolutionaries to take a negative view of judges making law.

This is reflected in the Napoleonic Code provision prohibiting judges from deciding a case by way of introducing a general rule (Article 5), since the creation of general rules is an exercise of legislative and not of judicial power. In theory, there is thus no case law in France. However, the courts still had to fill in the gaps in the laws and regulations and, indeed, were prohibited from refusing to do so (Article 4). Moreover, both the code and legislation have required judicial interpretation. Thus a vast body of case law has come into existence, but without any rule of stare decisis.

== Contents of the Napoleonic Code ==
The preliminary article of the code established certain important provisions regarding the rule of law. Laws could be applied only if they had been duly promulgated, and then only if they had previously been officially published (including provisions for publishing delays, given the means of communication available at the time). In brief, no secret laws were authorized. It prohibited ex post facto laws (i.e. laws that apply to events that occurred before their introduction). The code also prohibited judges from refusing to do justice on grounds of the insufficiency of the law, thereby encouraging them to interpret the law. On the other hand, it also prohibited judges from making general judgements of a legislative nature (see above).

With regard to family, the code established the supremacy of the husband over his wife and children, the status quo in Europe at the time. Women had even fewer rights than children. Divorce by mutual consent was abolished in 1804.

== Other French Napoleonic-era codes ==
The draft Military Code was presented to Napoleon by the special commission headed by Pierre Daru in June 1805; however, as the War of the Third Coalition progressed, the code was put aside and never implemented.

In 1791, Louis Michel le Peletier de Saint-Fargeau presented a new criminal code to the National Constituent Assembly. He explained that it outlawed only "true crimes", and not "phony offences created by superstition, feudalism, the tax system, and [royal] despotism". He did not list the crimes "created by superstition". The new penal code did not mention blasphemy, heresy, sacrilege, witchcraft, incest, or homosexuality, which led to these former offences being swiftly decriminalized. In 1810, a new criminal code was issued under Napoleon. As with the Penal Code of 1791, it did not contain provisions for religious crimes, incest, or homosexuality.

- After an overhaul of the entire legal system, the new code of civil procedure was adopted in 1806.
- The commercial code (code de commerce) was adopted in 1807. The kernel of the commercial code is the Book III, "Of The Different Modes of Acquiring Property", of the Napoleonic Code, which sets out norms for contracts and transactions.
- Code d'instruction: In 1808, the code d'instruction criminelle was published, laying out criminal procedure. The parlement system from before the Revolution, had been much abused, and the criminal courts established by the Revolution were complex and ineffective, subject to many local pressures. The genesis of this code resulted in much debate and the basis of the modern inquisitorial system of criminal courts in France and many civil law countries. It has significantly changed since, especially with regard to the rights of the defendant.

The French Revolution's Declaration of the Rights of Man and of the Citizen enunciated the presumption of innocence until found guilty. Concerned by the possibility of arbitrary arrest and detention, or excessive remand, Napoleon remarked that care should be taken to preserve personal freedoms, especially before the Imperial Court: "these courts would have a great strength, they should be prohibited from abusing this situation against weak citizens without connections." However, remand still was usual for defendants suspected of serious crimes such as murder.

The possibility of lengthy remand periods was one criticism—particularly voiced in common law countries—of the Napoleonic Code. Another concern was the combination of magistrate and prosecutor into a single role. However, once the work of the juge d'instruction was completed, the trial itself followed the principle of presumption of innocence; for example, the juror's oath explicitly required jurors not to betray the interests of the defendants or ignore their defense.

The rules governing court proceedings gave significant power to the prosecution; however, criminal justice in European countries in those days tended to repression. For instance, it was only in 1836 that prisoners charged with a felony were given a formal right to counsel in England. In comparison, article 294 of the Napoleonic Code of Criminal Procedure allowed the defendant access to a lawyer before a Cour d'assises, and mandated the court to appoint a lawyer for the defendants who did not have one. (Failing to do so nullified the proceedings.)

Whether or not the Cour d'assises, which judges severe crimes, should operate with a jury was a topic of considerable controversy. Napoleon supported jury trials (or petit jury), and they were finally adopted. On the other hand, Napoleon opposed the indictment jury ("grand jury" of common law countries), and preferred to assign this task to the criminal division of the Court of Appeals. Special courts were created to judge criminals who might intimidate the jury.

== French codes in the 21st century ==
The French codes, now more than 60 in number, are frequently amended, as well as judicially re-interpreted. Therefore, for over a century all of the codes in force have been documented in the annually revised editions published by Dalloz (Paris). These editions consist of thorough annotations, with references to other codes, relevant statutes, judicial decisions (even if unpublished), and international instruments. The "small (petit)" version of the Civil Code in this form is nearly 3,000 pages, available in print and online. Additional material, including scholarly articles, is added in the larger "expert (expert)" version and the still larger "mega (méga)" version, both of which are available in print and on searchable CD-ROM. By this stage, it has been suggested, the Civil Code has become "less a book than a database".

The sheer number of codes, together with digitization, led the Commission supérieure de codification to reflect in its annual report for 2011:

The Commission observes that the age of drawing up new codes is probably reaching its end. The aim of a nearly complete codification of the law is no longer pursued, for three reasons: firstly, the technical developments by which texts are provided in non-physical form offer to users modes of access that are comparable in many ways to those available through a code; secondly, the creation of new codes encounters a kind of law of diminishing returns in that, the more progress that is made in the development of new codes, the trickier it becomes to determine in which code particular provisions should be located; and, finally, it is clear that certain kinds of provision [...] are unsuitable for codification, since codification makes sense only when it involves provisions that possess sufficient generality.

A year later, the Commission recommended that, after its current codification projects were completed, there should not be any further codes; an additional reason was government delay in publishing reforms that the Commission had completed. The government responded encouragingly in March 2013, but the Commission in 2014 complained that this has not been followed through; in particular, that the government had abandoned its plan for a public service code (code général de la fonction publique).

== Codes in other countries ==
Even though the Napoleonic Code was not the first civil code, it was the first modern legal code to be widely adopted in Europe, and it influenced the law of many of the countries formed during and after the Napoleonic Wars. In the German regions on the west bank of the Rhine (Rhenish Palatinate and Prussian Rhine Province), the former Duchy of Berg and the Grand Duchy of Baden, the Napoleonic Code was influential until the introduction of the Bürgerliches Gesetzbuch in 1900 as the first common civil code for the entire German Empire.

A number of factors have been shown by Arvind and Stirton to have had a determinative role in the decision by the German states to receive the code, including territorial concerns, Napoleonic control and influence, the strength of central state institutions, a feudal economy and society, rule by liberal (enlightened despotic) rulers, nativism among the governing elites, and popular anti-French sentiment.

A civil code with Napoleonic code influences was also adopted in 1864 in Romania, and remained in force until 2011.

The term "Napoleonic Code" is also used to refer to legal codes of other jurisdictions that are influenced by the French Code Napoléon, especially the Civil Code of Lower Canada (replaced in 1994 by the Civil Code of Quebec), mainly derived from the Coutume de Paris, which the British continued to use in Canada following the 1763 Treaty of Paris. However, most of the laws in Latin American countries are not heavily influenced by the Napoleonic Code, as the Spanish and Portuguese versions of the civil code formed the foundation of the Latin American legal systems e.g. the Chilean, Mexican, and Puerto Rican civil codes.

In Mauritius, the Civil Code, which originates from the Napoleonic Code, represents an important primary source of law and provides for the rights of individuals, matrimonial regimes, contract law, and property law, amongst others. The French Civil Code was extended to Mauritius under the title Code Napoléon by decree of Charles Mathieu Isidore Decaen, Capitaine-General, on 21 April 1808. The Code was modified and embodied in Chapter 179 of the Revised Laws of Mauritius 1945, edited by Sir Charlton Lane, former Chief Justice of Mauritius. The 1808 decree was repealed by Act 9 of 1983, but the Revision of Laws Act which was enacted in 1974, made provision, in section 7, for the publication of the Code under the title "Code Civil Mauricien."

In the United States, the legal system is largely based on English common law. But the state of Louisiana is unique in being strongly influenced by French and Spanish legal traditions in its civil code. Spanish and French colonial forces quarreled over Louisiana during most of the 1700s, with Spain ultimately ceding the territory to France in 1800, which in turn sold the territory to the United States in 1803. The 10th Amendment to the U.S. Constitution grants states control of laws not specifically given to the federal government, so Louisiana's legal system retains many French elements. Examples of the practical legal differences between Louisiana and the other states include the bar exam and legal standards of practice for attorneys in Louisiana being significantly different from other states; Louisiana is the only U.S. state to practice forced inheritance of an estate; additionally, some of Louisiana's laws clash with the Uniform Commercial Code practiced by the other 49 states.

== See also ==
- Contemporary European law
- Labor Code (France)
- Les cinq codes

== Notes ==
- Roberts, Andrew (2014), "Lawgiver", Napoleon: A Life, Penguin. Of the commission's 107 plenary sessions, Napoleon chaired 55.
- Roberts, Andrew (2014), "Lawgiver", Napoleon: A Life, Penguin. It also failed in the Tribunate.
- Zamoyski, Adam (2018), "Caesar", Napoleon: A Life, Basic Books. It was promulgated as the "Civil Code of the French" (Code civil des Français), but would be known as "the Napoleonic Code" (Code Napoléon)
