= Cyclopædia of Biblical, Theological and Ecclesiastical Literature =

Reference work of ten volumes and two supplements published in the 19th century

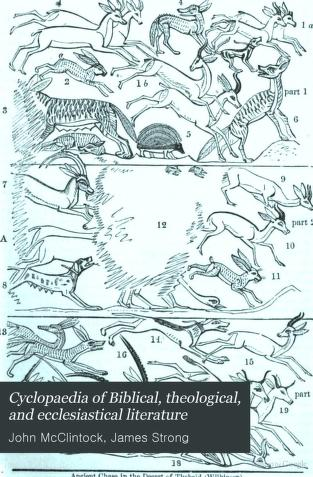
- Author: John McClintock
- Publication date: 1869

The Cyclopædia of Biblical, Theological and Ecclesiastical Literature is a reference work of ten volumes and two supplements published in the late 19th century, co-authored by John McClintock, academic and minister, and James Strong, professor of exegetical theology. The volumes were published by Harper and Brothers of New York.

== Scope ==
As an encyclopaedia, the authors set out to create a scholarly work, but accessible to the non-expert, designed to be

a Manual of Sacred Literature for the use of Ministers, Students, General Readers, and Sunday School Libraries, so complete in itself that no other work will be necessary for ordinary purposes of reference in these branches of knowledge.

Topics covered in the volumes include descriptions of proper names, locations, events, theological concepts, histories of the Christian Churches, and biographical sketches of notable religious figures.

== Contributors ==
These are some of the contributors as indicated by the preface.

W. J. A.—William J. Allison, then editor of the Friend's Review, Burlington, N. J.

B. B. A.—Prof. K. B. Anderson, Ph.D., of the Wisconsin University.

L. B.—The late Leonard Bacon, D.D., of the Yale Divinity School.

C. W. B.—Prof. C. W. Bennett, D.D., of the Garrett Biblical Institute, Evanston, III

J. K. B.—The late Rev. J. K. Burr, D.D., of the Newark Conference.

P. A. C—The late Pres. P. A. Ciiadbourne, D.D., LL.D., of Williams College, Mass.

T. W. C—The Rev. T. W. Chambers, D.D., of New York City.

L. C.—The late Prof. Lyman Coleman, D.D., of Lafayette College.

G. F. C.—Prof. George F. Comfort, D.D., of the Syracuse University, N. Y.

T. J. C—The Rev. Thomas J. Conant, D.D., Brooklyn, N. Y.

M. J. C.—The Rev. M. J. Cramer, D.D., formerly U. S. Minister to Denmark.

J. T. C—The late Rev. J. T. Crane, D.D., of the Newark Conference.

G. R. C—Prof. George R. Crooks, D.D., LL.D., of the Drew Theological Seminary.

D. C—The late Rev. Daniel Curry, D.D., LL.D., then editor of the Christian Advocate, N. Y.

R. D.—The Rev. Robert Davidson, D.D., Huntington, L. I.

D. D.—The late Rev. Daniel Devinne D.D., of the New York Conference.

G. B. D.—The late Prof. G. B. Docharty, I.L.D., of the College of the City of New York.

W. G. E.—The Rev. W. G. Easton, then of the British and Foreign Renew, London.

J. H. F.—Pres. J. H. Fairchild, D.D., LL.D., of Oberlin College, O.

G. P. F.—Prof. G. P. Fisher, D.D., of Yale College.

E. W. F.—The Rev. E. W. Flocken, missionary to Bulgaria.

J. M. F—The Rev. J. M. Freeman, D.D., of the M. E. S. S. Union.

E. V. G.—Prof. E. V. Gerhart, D.D., of the Mercersburgh Theological Seminary.

E. H. G.—The late Prof. E. H. Gillett, D.D., of the New York University.

D. R. G.—Prof. D. R. Goodwin, D.D., of the Protestant Episcopal Divinity School, Philadelphia.

J. T. G.—The Rev. J. T. Gracey, D.D., late missionary to India.

H. G.—The Rev. Henry Graham, D.D., of the Troy Conference.

W. E. G.—The Rev. W. E. Griffis, D.D., formerly missionary to Japan.

H. II.—The late Pres. H. Harbaugh, D.D., of the Mercersburgh Theological Seminary.

W. E, II.—W. E. Hathaway, editor of the Herald of Peace, Chicago, 111.

D. C. H.—The Rev. D. C. Haynes, D.D., Bainbridge, N. J.

D. Y. H.—The late Rev. D. Y. Heisler, D.D., Mt. Alto, Pa.

R. D. H.—The late Pres. R. D. Hitchcock, D.D., LL.D., of the Union Theological Seminary.

A. A. H.—The late Prof. A. A. Hodge, D.D., of the Princeton Theological Seminary.

C. H.—The late Prof. Charles Hodge, D.D., LL.D., of the Princeton Theological Seminary.

J. H.—The Rev. Joseph Holdicih, D.D., late Sec. of "the Am. Bible Society.

G. F. H.—Prof. George F. Holmes, LL.D., late of the University of Virginia.

J. F. H.—Bishop John- F. Hurst, D.D., LL.D., then of the Martin Mission Institute, Frankfort, Germany.

M. S. I.—The Rev. M. S. Isaacs, editor of the Jewish Messenger, X. V.

H. E. J.—Prof. H. E. Jacobs, D.D., of the Gettysburgh College, Pa.

U. J.—The late Mr. Oliver Johnson, formerly of the Independent, N. V.

D. P. K.—Prof. D. P. Kidder, D.D., late of the Drew Theological Seminary.

J. P. L.—The late Prof. J. P. Lacroix, Ph.D., of the Ohio Wesleyan University.

J. B. L.—The Rev. J. B. Logan, editor of the Western Cumberland Presbyterian, Alton, I1L

J. \V. M.—Prof. J. W. Marshall, A.M., late of Dickinson College.

T. V. M.—The Rev. T. V. Moore, D.D., Nashville, Tenn.

B. H. N.—The late Prof. B. H. Nadal, of the Drew Theological Seminary.

E. A. P.—Prof. E. A. Park, D.D., of the Andover Theological Seminary.

VV. E. P.—The Rev. W. E. Park, D.D., Lawrence, Mass.

W. K. P.—The Rev. W. K. Pendleton, D.D., President of the Bethany College, Va.

B. P.—The Rev. B. Pick, Ph.D., Alleghany, Pa.

S. H. P.—The Rev. S. H. Platt, of the N. Y. East Conference.

J. P.—The late Rev. James Porter, D.D., of the N. E. Conference.

N. P.—Ex-pres. Noah Porter, D.D., LL.D., of Yale College.

J. N. P.—Mr. Jules N. Proeschel, formerly of Paris, France.

A. H. Q.—The Rev. A. H. Quint, D.D., editor of the Congregational Quarterly, Boston.

M. R.—Prof. Miner Raymond, D.D., of the Garrett Biblical Institute, Evanston, 111.

H. B. R.—Pres. H. B. Ridgway, D.D., of the Garrett Biblical Institute, Evanston, 111.

J. R.—The Rev. James Roy, LL.D., Cobourg, Canada.

P. S.—Prof. Philip Schaff, D.D., LL.D., of the Union Theological Seminary.

A. J. S.—The late Prof. A. J. Schem, formerly of Dickinson College.

R. R. S.—The Rev. R. R. Schippen, D.D., of the Am. Unitarian Association, Boston, Mass.

E. de S.—Bishop E. de Schweinitz, D.D., editor of the Moravian, Bethlehem, Pa.

C. W. S.—C. W. Smiley, A.M., of the Smithsonian Institution, Washington, D. C.

J. H. S.—The Rev. J. H. Smith, D.D., of Newark, N. J.

L. E. S.—Prof. L. E. Smith, D.D., formerly of the Examiner and Chronicler, N. Y.

R. P. S.—The Rev. R. P. Smith, D.D., dean of Canterbury, England.

J. L. S.—The Rev. J. L. Sooy, A.M., of the N. J. Conference.

A. S.—The Rev. Abel Stevens, LL.D., formerly editor of the Christian Advocate, N. Y.

G. J. S.—The late Mr. G. J. Stevenson, A.M., London, England.

J. C. S.— The Rev. J. C. Stockbridge, D.D., Providence, R I.

M. L. S.—The late Prof. M. L. Stoever, D.D., of Pennsylvania College.

W. P. S.—The late Rev. W. P. Strickland, D.D., N. Y.

T. O. S.—The late Prof. T. O. Summers, D.D., of the Vanderbilt University, Tenn.

G. L. T.—The Rev. G. L. Taylor. LL.D., of the N. Y. East Conference.

W. G. R. T.—The Rev. W. J. R. Taylor, D.D., formerly Secretary of the Am. Bible Society.

H. W. T.—Howard W. Tilton, A.B., of the Chicago Post.

W. F. W.—Vies. W. F. Warren, D.D., LL.D., of the Boston University.

S. W.—The Rev. Thomas Webster, D.D., Newburg, Canada.

E. W.—The late Rev. E. Wentworth, D.D., formerly editor of the Ladies' Repository, Cincinnati, O.

J. P. W.—The late Rev. J. P. Westervelt, Paterson, N. J.

J.P.W.—The Rev. J. P. Weston, D.D., Pres. of the Franklin Academy, Mass.

H. C. W.—The late Rev. H. C. Westwood, D.D, Princeton, N. J.

D. A. W.—The Rev. D. A. Whedon, D.D., of the N. E. Southern Conference.

C. P. W.—The late Rev. C. P. Wing, D.D., Carlisle, Pa.

A. W.—Prof. Alexander Winchell, LL.D., Ann Arbor, Mich.

D. W.—The Rev. Daniel Wise, D.D., Englewood, N. J.

I. H W.—The Rev. I. M. Wise, D.D., editor of the Israelite, Cincinnati, 0.

T. D. W-—The late ex-pres. T. D. Woolsey, D.D., of Yale College.

J.H.W.—Prof. J. H. Worman, Ph.D., formerly Librarian of the Drew Theological Seminary.

R.Y.— The late Rev. R. Yeakel, D.D., Secretary of the S. S. and Tract Association, Cleveland, O.

== Volumes ==
Note: Publication year listed is the earliest edition known to exist. It's possible they were first printed before the listed date.

- Volume I: A, B. 1867.
- Volume II: C, D. 1868.
- Volume III: E, F, G. 1871.
- Volume IV: H, I, J. 1872.
- Volume V: K, L, Mc. 1873. (registration required). Republished as Volume V: K, L, Mc. 1882.
- Volume VI: Me-Nev. 1876.
- Volume VII: New-Pes. 1877.
- Volume VIII: Pet-Re. 1879.
- Volume IX: Rh-St. 1880.
- Volume X: Su-Z. 1881.
- Supplement Volume I: A-Cn. 1885. (no scan available, but alleged to exist). Republished as Supplement Volume I: A-Cn. 1889. Republished as Volume XI: A-Cn. 1891.
- Supplement Volume II: Co-Z. 1887. Republished as Volume XII: Co-Z. 1891.
