= Analogia entis =

Philosophical claim about the class of language or knowledge of the "being" of God

The analogia entis (Latin for "analogy of being") is the philosophical claim that the class of relationship of the "being" of created things and the "being" of God is that of analogy. And also the theological and devotional ramifications of this claim.

This entails that God's existence is entirely different to the being and modes of being of all things in the cosmos (all "creatures") and therefore to us is ineffable directly: however, analogy can provide true but indirect (though not necessarily reliable) cognition. All other predications apart from "being" may be treated in the same way, as analogical. It has also been summarized as the proposition that there is no (e.g. natural or conceptual) system of which God and creatures are both directly part.

It has been called a guiding principle of Catholic thought (or Denkform (Note: Denkform: "a guiding principle of thought for theology that is grounded in a metaphysics.")) which synthesizes many disparate themes in Catholic doctrine and theology: that general names or predications about God (not only names such as "is a Consuming Fire", "is our Father", "is Patient" or predications of God's perfections "is infinite", "is love", "is just", but even being itself: that God "is") are true but analogies. It is associated with the Latin phrase "maior dissimulitudo in tanta similitudine":

For between creator and creature there can be noted no similarity so great that a greater dissimilarity cannot be seen between them.

— Fourth Lateran Council, 1215.

The modern formulation of the analogia entis emphasizes a cognitive rhythm (drawing on Aquinas' via credentia): a double motion of in and beyond:

What is meant by analogia entis is precisely this: that in the very same act in which the human being comes to intimate God in the likeness of the creature, he also comes to intimate Him as the one who is beyond all likeness.

— Przywara, Schriften vol 2, p404

Some 20th century Protestant theologians suspected analogia entis as proposing a different source of knowledge of God to divine revelation, or proposing acts competitive to the event of faith, or for tending to emphasize God's transcendence over his immanence.

== Background ==
There is no single, universally authoritative, and unambiguous doctrine of the analogia entis.

— Ry O. Siggelkow

Analogia entis has had rather different meanings in particular philosophical, theological or devotional disciplines: sometimes with broad meaning (e.g., used for any divine predication) or narrow meaning (e.g., used strictly about divine being only), and sometimes used to name its perceived implications.

The term comes from Greek geometry, where it is used for a rule (in the sense of a measurement: κανών kanōn, this being sometimes extended into the sense of a requirement or law.) Used in this sense, "analogy" relates to the geometric/epistimological question "what can we soundly measure against to understand God?" rather than the mental/phenomenological/theological question "what does analogy let us say about God?" which this article more concentrates on. (Note: Used in the former sense, "analogia entis" becomes one of several competing choices to be evaluated, such as the rule of faith, the rule of charity, etc. The term "analogy of faith" is also used, in the sense of measurement, for the Biblical hermeneutic assertion that "Scripture interprets itself" (scriptura sui ipsius interpres.) The term "rule of faith" was also use for early creeds regarded as the underlying basis necessary for non-fanciful interpretation of Scripture and Tradition.)

=== Development ===
The term was originally coined around 1250 by Albert Magnus and developed subsequently, notably in the 1920s and 1930s by Jesuit Erich Przywara and Germanic theologians, such as former Jesuit Hans Urs von Balthasar. The concept has a longer history than the term, and drew on commentary by Pseudo-Dionysius the Areopagite and Aristotle.

=== Analogy ===
Analogia entis is not a fancy synonym for analogy; however, the term is sometimes enlarged so that 'being' includes all kinds of analogous predication about God not just essential and infinite being.

Analogy has the general form A is to B as C is to D:

A : B :: C : D

So "one and the same term is analogically attributed to two realities whenever it is attributed to each of them in a way which is partially the same and partially different."

Some analogies get presented condensed (e.g., into metaphors) by leaving out terms so that one thing is referred to by mentioning another: A is a C. (There is a core case, which other terms relate to in various pros hen ways.) So "God is Good" is the analogy "the goodness of humans is to their nature as the goodness of God is to his nature.."

Analogical reasoning can be distinguished from other modes, such as induction and deduction. Analogical statements can be distinguished from other kinds of statement, such as univocal and equivocal.

Such analogy is asymmetric, working in one direction only: the metaphor "God is Father" (i.e., the analogy "God is to us as a human father is to their child") does not imply "Father is God." Similarly, an analogical statement does not rule out another statement that would be contradictory if interpreted univocally: "God is Father" does not rule out "God is Mother." But every analogy breaks down when extended too far. (Note: "Every analogy breaks down, because in analogy you are always comparing two aspects of similar but not identical entities.")

In Christian thought, God is commonly analogized against many created or experienced things: being, goodness, truth, beauty, just, kindness, love, a friend, a judge, an advocate, a fire, a hound, a worm, divine law.

=== Cognition ===
Scientist Douglas Hofstadter has claimed that analogy is the "core of human cognition." Pseudo-Dionysius' purported book Symbolic Theology discussed dissimilar similarities and the need for the human mind to have and use symbols. (Note: "The scriptural symbol goes further, attempting to reveal the God who is before and beyond even the intelligible truth. The highest human intellect has little ability to attain this truth directly, and so we cannot rely on intellectual teachers as guides to that truth. We require the gift of symbols, which tie our ordinary comprehension to the godhead beyond being. And so Dionysius does not describe the symbolic names as pedagogical tools developed by theologians. The names appear instead in the ecstatic visions of the prophets. Stanford Encyclopedia of Philosophy")

One facet of analogia entis is as a fallible, non-mystical human cognitive event involving the characteristic double motion of in-and-beyond (and distinct from deduction, intuition, instress, etc.) and subsequent unresolveable oscillation between the in and the beyond.

==== Religious cognition ====
In Catholic usage, the analogia entis is a foundational organizing and epistemological principle of religious cognition: (Note: Philosopher Ernst Wolff states "[...]understanding of the human being as imago Dei is Thomistic: because of the analogia entis – the idea that our characteristics are analogous with the ways in which God exists – we are able to know something about God[...]" however this may be backwards.) for Bonaventure, for example, the cosmos is conceived as a treasury of things that can be used for analogy.

All created things of the sensible world lead the mind of the contemplator and wise man to eternal God[...] They are the shades, the resonances, the pictures of that efficient, exemplifying, and ordering art; they are the tracks, simulacra, and spectacles; they are divinely given signs set before us for the purpose of seeing God. They are exemplifications set before our still unrefined and sense-oriented minds, so that by the sensible things which they see they might be transferred to the intelligible which they cannot see, as if by signs to the signified." (Note: In the expression of St Augustine "For it is both sought in order that it may be found more sweetly, and found in order that it may be sought more eagerly. [On the Trinity, book X, chap 2])

— Bonaventure, Itinerarium mentis ad Deum, 2.11, as quoted

Aquinas' ideas on analogy presuppose that "cognition of the supernatural realm cannot be attained from this world by the mere exercise of our natural cognitive powers, but only through divine revelation and faith in the content of this revelation."

Modern Popes have treated analogy as one cognitive mechanism which revelation may use:

I want only to state that reality and truth do transcend the factual and the empirical, and to vindicate the human being's capacity to know this transcendent and metaphysical dimension in a way that is true and certain, albeit imperfect and analogical. [...]Faith clearly presupposes that human language is capable of expressing divine and transcendent reality in a universal way—analogically, it is true, but no less meaningfully for that.

— Pope John Paul II, Fides et ratio., S83, S84

== Philosophical ==
=== Analogy ===
Medieval theologian Thomas Aquinas took the distinction between the univocal and equivocal terms from Aristotle's Categories and also an intermediate but distinct kind: analogical terms where you understand something greater by the measure of something lesser. (Note: "The principle of analogy arises for Aquinas as a means to resolve as a means to resolve the common predicament, namely, to answer the question concerning how human language is capable of talk about God, who is genuinely other than the world.") For Aquinas, "nothing can be said in the same sense of God and creatures." According to theologian K. Surin "at the heart of Aquinas' views on the nature of language about God is his thesis that all assertions about God are to be construed analogically." This linguistic thesis then is the ground for his metaphysical theses.

Thomas Cajetan attempted to reduce all analogy to three kinds (inequality, attribution, proportionality) and state which ones, in logical use, could be used syllogistically.

In the modern version of analogia entis, while the object providing the "measure" can be any thing, the subject of the intimation is specifically God. (Note: Von Balthasar notes " However analogia entis may be defined in philosophical detail,...the terms employed cannot be traced back to a generic concept.")

The thing being measured may not only be some created thing or positive transcendental or perfection (i.e. things having 'being' in some real or metaphysical sense) but also a negative thing or absence: seeing in some bad thing the absence of expected good provides the analogy for reckoning God as the being with no absence of good (in) then seeing (beyond) that God is infinitely more than 'good'.

=== Predication and names of God ===
Following from the Fourth Lateran Council, all "God is ..." statements must be interpreted analogically not absolutely. For example, all the following cases are analogies because love, fire, unity, etc. are limited (at least by having finite definitions) while God is not limited.

- Deuteronomy 4:24 "For the LORD your God is a consuming fire"
- Deuteronomy 6:4 "The LORD our God, the LORD is one"
- Psalms 84:11 "For the LORD God is a sun and shield"
- 1 John 1:5 "God is light; in him there is no darkness at all"
- 1 John 4:8 "God is love"

Aquinas discussed this as analogia nominum (analogy of names).

- Exodus 3:14 "I am who am"

For St Thomas Aquinas, even "being" as in: "I am who am" of Exodus 3:14, is an analogy when used of God: our understanding God's "being" is by analogy to our being.

[...] whatever names unqualifiedly designate a perfection without defect are predicated of God and of other things: for example, goodness, wisdom, being, and the like. But when any name expresses such perfections along with a mode that is proper to a creature, it can be said of God only according to likeness and metaphor. [...] For we cannot grasp what God is, but only what He is not and how other things are related to Him[...]

— Summa contra gentiles, 30 2,4

=== Dialectic ===
Theologian Ivor Morris saw Analogia entis as dialecticism, "though not of the Hegelian kind, the obvious difference being that[...]the movement of thought is poised between thesis and antithesis and never advances, as with Hegel, to the idea of a higher synthesis."

Przywara saw this unresolving 'poise' not as static but dynamically, as a cognitive/logical trembling or oscillation between the thesis in and antithesis beyond that must always cycle between the two: (Note: "Przywara makes room for a peculiar kind of natural theology: the structure of human existence and the way we posit ourselves intellectually in this world inevitably points towards a dilemma that can in principle be acknowledged by all, but which can be resolved only from a theological perspective.[...](Such) natural knowledge[...]is not supposed to be a bond that unites the human world with the God, but something that reveals the infinite distance, the ever greater dissimilarity, between them, there being a trembling or oscillation between the two.)

"The analogy of being is not an analogy of inequality, as if God and creation could be compared even if only for the purpose demonstrating how dissimilar they are. Instead, the "ever greater" denotes a dynamic disproportionality, so that whatever characteristics we attribute to God must be continually dis/qualified on the basis of a difference that has no limit or end."

— Steven Webb, The End of the Analogy of Being.

=== Epistemology ===
Thomas Aquinas wrote:

Our natural knowledge begins from sense. It can therefore extend so far as it can be led by sensible things.[...]But since effects depend on their cause, sensible things can lead us to know that God exists, and to know what is bound to be attributable to him as the first cause of all things, and as transcending all his effects. In this way we know that God is related to creatures as the cause of them all; that he differs from creatures, since he is none of the things caused by him; and that creatures are separated from God because God transcends them, not because of any defect in God

— Aquinas, Summa Theologiae, Appendix to Q. 4, Art. 3, 12, Art. 12. (Whether, in this life, God can be known through natural reason.)

=== Metaphysics ===
The metaphysical distinction between essence and existence in all beings apart from God is termed the real distinction. In Thomistic theology, God is whose essence is his existence.

==== Ontology ====
Key proponents of analogia entis tend to position it as post-philosophical theology. John Betz summarizes Przywara's stance: "For as of yet, from a purely philosophical perspective, nothing whatsoever can be made out about who God is or what he has revealed, or even that there is such thing as revelation."

In this view, Analogia entis is to some extent founded on a philosophical claim about the "ground of being" of creatures which then allows theological investigation. Przywara's argument is that "All that can be made out metaphysically with any degree of certainty apart from [i.e., when excluding] revelation is that creaturely being is not its own ground, that it is not being itself, that it 'is' only in the form of becoming, and that theology, that is, the science of a God of revelation, is a reasonable possibility or to put it in still more minimalist terms, a 'non-impossibility'"

=== Phenomenology ===
For Edith Stein the relationship between Being and Becoming is analogia entis; 'being' is anything we can think of; she distinguished finite and infinite being.

"We speak of God in the best ways that are available to us by ascribing to God in an analogous way the perfections found in creatures."

==== Theophany ====
For Stein, the analogia entis is a relation between two "I am": the human and creatural "I am" and the divine "I am." Stein starts with the phenomenon of individual awareness, ego cognito: "my certitude about my own existence is the most primordial, intimate and immediate self-experience I can have": this real, temporal, finite being that one experiences as her own is an analogue of ("faintly visible") divine, eternal being.

=== Detractors ===
14th century philosopher-theologian John Duns Scotus and some subsequent theologians propose a Univocity of being: that God's existence and our existence is the same concept of being, though in different modes.

== Theological ==
Some key proponents of analogia entis position it as theology not philosophy. Von Balthasar, corresponding with Karl Barth, wrote "the analogia is in no sense a philosophical but rather a purely theological principle"

=== Biblical roots ===
Multiple passages in the Bible decry the human ability to directly grasp and understand God directly or well. Isaiah 55:8 "My ways are not your ways, and neither are my thoughts your thoughts." Rom 11:34 "Who has known the mind of God?"

However, Psalm 19:1 "The heavens declare the glory of God; the skies proclaim the work of his hands."

"For since the creation of the world, God's invisible qualities – his eternal power and divine nature – have been clearly seen, being understood from what has been made, so that men are without excuse." (Romans 1:20)

The Peshitta version of I Cor 13:12 translated to Aramaic then to English expresses it: "Now we see as in a mirror, in an allegory, but then face-to-face. Now I know partially, but then I shall know as I am known." (I Cor 13:12)

=== Catholic formulation ===
The idea was found implicitly in Book XV of Augustine's De Trinitate in approach later called the via eminentia. (Note: This has been expressed as "although God is sublime, we must speak of God in positive affirmations...they must be purged from the way they are realised in human beings. This is done by way of an affirmation of every attribute, followed by a negation of the same, but not to the degree that the attribute loses its meaning altogether. What we subsequently are left with is not any concept that is identical with God but nevertheless signifies a real likeness.")

The major formulation of the idea was given in passing—in a comment that the kind of perfection in grace that humans could attain is not the same as the perfection of God but only analogous—by the Fourth Lateran Council of 1215 "For between creator and creature there can be noted no similarity so great that a greater dissimilarity cannot be seen between them." (Latin: maior dissimulitudo in tanta similitudine)

=== Scholastic formulations ===
==== Aquinas ====
Thomas Aquinas provides a three-fold distinction: "We do not know what God is but only what is he is not and what relation he maintains with everything" Summa contra Gentiles I:30: It is this relation that is the basis of analogia entis. For Aquinas, the analogia entis is placed as a form of knowledge that is intermediate but distinct from what is known by the positive theology via causalitatis (Cataphatic theology) and by what is known via negativa (Apophatic theology): this is called the via eminentiae. The analogia entis is not cataphatic, in the sense associated with Pseudo-Dionysius the Areopagite, because analogy does not limit God. (Note: "Fundamental to (the) medieval conception of the world was a conception of language and thought (and indeed reality) as functioning analogically, grounded on the doctrine of creation. [...] Thus when we say "God exists" and "Creatures exist" we are using the term "exists" analogously, not univocally (and not equivocally either, since a real likeness is there).")

The most perfect [state] to which we can attain in this life in our knowledge of God is that he transcends all that can be conceived by us, and that the naming of God through remotion [removal] (per remotionem) is most proper … The primary mode of naming God is through the negation of all things, since he is beyond all, and whatever is signified by any name whatsoever is less than that which God is.

— Thomas Aquinas, Summa theologica, Ia. 13.5

Aquinas situates this in a typical descent-ascent (exitus-reditus- movement: God's perfections (e.g. "Good") perpetually descend to creatures, are noticed and named by intellects; in turn, "the intellect that assigns the names ascends from creatures to God". Thus any psychological ascent is consequent to this providential descent (i.e. it is not autonomous revelation independent of grace, but an effect of grace.)

==== Anselm ====
Anselm of Canterbury's Proslogion first addresses God as "you are that than which a greater cannot be conceived" [emphasis added] (his famous Ontological argument) but then "you are that which greater than can be conceived" [emphasis added]: interpreted by analogia entis the former is the in step and the latter is the beyond step: a paradox perhaps but not a contradiction.

Anselm fills out the beyond step stating that "God is before and beyond even eternal things" and "that he alone is what he is and who he is."

==== Late ====
Notable 16th Century scholastic formulators of analogia entis were Thomas Cajetan and John of St. Thomas, and Francisco Suárez's Disputationes Metaphysicae. Cajetan distinguished three kinds of analogy: analogy of inequality (where, on examination, two things are the same), and the uninteresting analogy of attribution (where, under the hood, two things are distinct), and the proper, geometric analogy of proportion which avoids the fallacy of equivocation.

==== Descartes ====
According to historian William Ashworth, Descartes held that God's immutability was the ground of natural laws and the conservation of motion, but denied that the world was "a collection of signs that demonstrated divine attributes or pointed to God." However, his philosophy has been called a kind of analogia entis argument for the inner world only in its concern for essence, existence and cognition, even though it rejects the remainder of scholastic theology.

=== Modern formulations ===
Until recently, most of the key 20th century theological writings on analogia entis were unknown and unavailable in English. Consequently, it has had a much greater influence on continental (especially German-reading Catholic) theologians than anglophone ones.

==== Erich Przywara ====
The modern positioning of analogia entis as being essential to (and quintessential of) Catholic theology was driven by mid-century Jesuit theologian Fr. Erich Przywara. Analogia entis explicates a key part of Jesuit spirituality: St Augustine's dynamic slogan Latin: Deus semper major ("God is always greater") was the title of Przywara's theological commentary on the Spiritual Exercises of Ignatius of Loyola.

For example, his difficult 1932 book Analogia Entis: Metaphysics: Original Structure and Universal Rhythm provides a major formulation of the idea: this ever-greater God "explodes the limits of every metaphysics as such." (Note: and even within the realm of religion itself uproots every "rootedness" and lifts it into a condition of "pure hanging"." Pzyrwara, Analogia Entis, apud For Pzyrwara, this explosion must also blow up some influential Catholic dogmatic tendencies: (Note: "Przywara's understanding of the analogia entis came much closer to Barth's own position than the doctrine he saw at work in much of Catholic theology and was so bent on demolishing.") though it could be treated as a theological system, "rightly understood, the analogy of being is the destruction of every system." Theologian Aidan Nichols notes this is "in favour of a totally objective availability of the creature for God and for the divine measure of the creature.") Theologian John Milbank has called this book "one of the great masterworks of twentieth-century theology and philosophy."

Przywara's thought has been summarized as "the more we grow towards God, the more we realise how much further than we thought we need to grow." (Note: He also deals with much wider and more detailed or obscure philosophical issues than this suggests, participating in early 20th century European philosophical/theological currents such as Existentialism, Phenomonology, dialectical theology as well as traditional Augustinianism and Thomism, all under the rubric of analogia entis, and perhaps inappropriately technical for an encyclopedia article.)

Przywara saw the analogia entis as central or essential to Catholic theology, to the history of Western thought, (Note: "For Przywara analogia entis was a dynamic theory that attempted to synthesize the history of western thought.) to truth (Note: An understanding of the analogical character of truth and being enables us to affirm that real knowledge is available in history even though this knowledge is not fully self-complete or exhaustive. The analogia entis is the principle of relation between truth in history and truth in its purity.") and indeed to reality: (Note: His "insistence on understanding all of creation as both oriented toward and ordered under God.") we understand by (or receive inspiration from) mediating analogies. (Note: Though this is not automatic: "All movements towards God, all illumination by God of the human experience which seeks to enlighten itself, presupposes a tranquil condition of 'God in me and I in God', because precisely by reason of the nature of the analogia entis, the relationship between God and man is not a function of man's activity, but of God's condescension." Przywara, Religionphilosophie, p. 410) For Przywara, the analogy entis is a communication from God that calls the believer into service (kenosis).

For Przywara, the analogia entis is nothing more than God's concurrent immanence (in the world) and transcendence (beyond the world). In Przywara's view, numerous Catholic doctrines and devotions flow from the analogia entis as a noetic form, such as the Catholic understanding of the Incarnation, synergism (the cooperation of humans and God in salvation), sacramentalism, mystical piety, religious authority and community, the example of Mary, and the nature of the church.

Far from being a rhetorical trope or a philosophical tool, analogy for Przywara is the style of thought that best corresponds to the way in which being makes itself known. Not only is analogy, for Przywara, built into every level of Catholic theology. It is the glue that holds those levels together.

— Stephen H. Webb, The End of the Analogy of Being

==== Hans Urs von Balthasar ====
For Przywara's protégé Fr. Hans Urs von Balthasar, Christ is the "concrete analogy of being", being both God and man: we learn everything of God by looking at Christ as the measure. (Note: Such as that the Christ is the concrete analogy between the God of wrath and mercy and creatures as condemned and redeemed.)

For Przywara and many subsequent theologians, such as Hans Urs von Balthasar, analogia entis is seen as a primary tool by which a multitude of apparently disparate things (such as the Real Distinction) have a unity, and can be analyzed or weighed (and this to the extent that analogia entis has been criticised as a theological panacea.)

Von Baltasar responds to Barth's concern that analogia entis sidelines Christ for scholastic wordplay, with a theology that Christ's homostatic union (as both God and man) itself is a necessary analogy of the divine homoousios within the Trinity.

Von Balthasar invokes the analogia entis in multiple other places:

- He further says The saint is right, contrary to all those who see him from the outside, to feel that he is the worst sinner and failure (because the saint knows more than us due to their analogia entis experience of God' holiness.)
- As an implication, because analogous statements are approximate, a certain Christological and theological pluralism (Catholicism) is necessarily due to these individual limitations.

The analogia entis is a condition of good theology and a test of bad theology. (Note: In Balthasar's Truth is Symphonic he says the theological expression "must cause the act of God's love for us to appear more divine, more radical, more complete and at the same time more unimaginable and improbable[...] whenever, in our elucidation of the mystery, some aspect appears lucidly clear from the rational point of view, causing the mystery quality (which announces the "greater dissimilarity" of God, his distinctive divinity) to retreat at that point and opening up a wider spiritual landscape—there heresy has been found, or at least the bounds of theological pluralism has been overstepped.")

==== Joseph Ratzinger ====
Pope Benedict XVI's Regensberg address said:

The faith of the Church has always insisted that between God and us, between his eternal Creator Spirit and our created reason, there exists a real analogy, in which - as the Fourth Lateran Council in 1215 stated - unlikeness remains infinitely greater than likeness, yet not to the point of abolishing analogy and its language. God does not become more divine when we push him away from us in a sheer, impenetrable voluntarism; rather, the truly divine God is the God who has revealed himself as logos and, as logos, has acted and continues to act lovingly on our behalf.

— Regensberg Address, 9/12/06])

That analogy is real is the ground by which we can say that what is measured (i.e. in) and what is beyond, though so great, are not so different in kind and scale as to be meaningless, because what is in is there because of the free choice of the creator and so allows him to reveal himself.

Pope Benedict also spoke of "the great et-et" (both-and) of Catholicism: both faith and works, Jesus being both God and Man, etc., things which are in apparent contradiction: for proponents of analogia entis it provides a resolution without falling into paradox.

=== Orthodox treatment ===
The modern Eastern Orthodox theologian David Bentley Hart uses the analogia entis in his book The Beauty of the Infinite, noting "The analogy of being does not analogize God and creatures under the more general category of being, but is the analogization of being (itself) in the difference between God and creatures." (p241-2) (Note: "The analogy of being, according to Hart's thought, indeed uniquely and effectually obliterates any dualistic thought, and properly allows for creation to be perceived as an analogical expression of God's being, participating in the jubilant life of the Trinity and, thereby, bearing testimony to the richness of the beauty that marks God's glorious infinitude. [...] For Hart, the analogy of being [...] indeed serves as nothing other than a divine gift through which every dualism, especially the "separation between flesh and spirit" (leading to the negation of corporeal creation) is overcome, and the "grammar of doxology" is magnificently revealed in this world")

However Orthodox theologian John Romanides claimed that "the very presuppositions of (Augustian) theology (whether) based on analogia entis and analogia fidei has nothing in common with the Fathers of the Roman Ecumenical Councils" and they are "not accepted by any Orthodox Father of the Church." In this view, there is simply no similarity between creature and creator, no possible analogy. One criticism is that analogia entis promotes an intellective ascent rather than theoria. Another theologian's reported characterization of analogia entis goes as far as claiming "The analogy of being refers to the fact that there is a relation between the created and the uncreated being; that God created the world from archetypes and that man’s salvation rests on the return of his soul to the uncreated world of ideas."

=== Protestant treatments ===
Analogia entis was not an issue in Reformation theology and not considered a rival to special revelation. (Note: Belgic Confession (1561) Article 2: The Means by Which We Know God We know him by two means: First, by the creation, preservation, and government of the universe, since that universe is before our eyes like a beautiful book in which all creatures, great and small, are as letters to make us ponder the invisible things of God: his eternal power and his divinity, as the apostle Paul says in Romans 1:20. [...] Second, he makes himself known to us more openly by his holy and divine Word, [...]) For Martin Luther, reason "knows that there is a God, but it does not know who or which is the true God." Calvinists have stressed the correct limits of ideas such as analogia entis. (Note: The Confession of Faith of the Assembly of Divines at Westminster (1646) "Although the light of nature, and the works of creation and providence do so far manifest the goodness, wisdom, and power of God, as to leave men unexcusable;" with the proviso "yet are they not sufficient to give that knowledge of God, and of His will, which is necessary unto salvation.")

According to theologian Ry Siggelkow, "It is now widely acknowledged that the numerous debates that have ensued around the analogia entis have been remarkably confused." (Note: "On the Protestant side, following Barth, the analogia entis has often been rejected for setting up a formal system that comes too close to subsuming God into creation. On the Catholic side, however, it is commonly argued that the analogia entis does nothing of the sort. Rather, it has been asserted time and time again that the analogia entis is, in fact, intended to protect the sheer otherness of God.")

Some Protestant detractors take the analogia entis as meaning that unsaved humans can reach a saving knowledge of God outside grace, revelation, faith, etc., but merely by autonomous insight. For example, theologian Paul Brazier claims analogia entis is, or comes down to, "the idea that we can know and understand God soundly, securely, primarily, through analogy in God's creation." (Note: ...grounding our theologizing in creation and the world is the analogia entis (the analogy of being), often this involves seeing God in the processes of nature; the latter, where the primary link between God and humanity is in and through the Christ, is the analogia fidei (the analogy of faith).")

Some Protestant commentators connect the analogia entis to ideas of the Trinitarian Vestages mentioned by St Thomas Aquinas, and Thomistic ideas that an effect resembles its cause, therefore being a form of natural theology, unacceptable to e.g. Calvinists but acceptable to other theology.

Among attempts to reconcile analoga entis with a so-called analogia fidei are theologian K. Sura's comment that "analogy from the perspective of God is an analogy of being, analogy from the perspective of man is an analogy of faith."

==== Karl Barth ====
Karl Barth, a 20th-century German Protestant dogmatic theologian who was a friend of Erich Przywara and Hans Urs von Balthasar, notoriously asserted at one stage that the analogia entis was the only thing that prevented him becoming Catholic, and the invention of the anti-Christ. (Note: Both men (Barth and Przywara) agree that the analogia entis is determinative of the fundamental differences as between the Roman Catholic and Protestant interpretations of Scripture, sacramental grace, the relation of faith and works in salvation as well as religious authority. Nielsen op. cit.) (Note: From Catholic dogmas on Mary to papal infallibility, Barth saw the analogia entis as the formal principle always lurking in the shadows, providing the framework and basis for much of what he found to be problematic in Catholicism.)

Barth's views may have altered radically over his life: Protestant theologian Ry Siggelkow puts it "In contrast to Barth's early critique, which interpreted the doctrine as emphasizing an ontological similarity between God's being and creaturely being, the later Barth, according to Jüngel, feared that the so-called analogia entis would not do justice to the difference between God and man by overlooking the nearness of God."

The early critique: using Aquinas' teachings that grace does not destroy but supports and perfects nature (Latin: gratia non destruit se supponit et perficit naturam), and that the analogia entis means humans participate in a similarity to God ( similitudo Dei); Barth reasoned that consequently if the experience of God is always a possibility, the analogia entis circumvents the need for grace. Barth regarded it as a kind of natural theology and therefore counter to salvation by grace and scriptural revelation of the new covenant only (and particularly imprudent in Nazi Germany as potentially reinforcing their nature-worship mythologies.) God alone provides knowledge, nothing comes from a consideration of natural things. However, Protestant theologian Jonathan Platter notes that "Barth did misunderstand both Thomas (Aquinas) and Przywara in attributing to them the idea that the analogia entis locates the possibility of revelation in a relation established by creation prior to the grace enacted in Christ."

Catholic writers tend to view Barth's early objections as, to some extent, based on a caricature or extra baggage Fr. Przywara stressed "analogia entis in no way signifies a 'natural theology'" (Note: "Przywara emphasizes that Catholic piety and reflection alike have been characteristically motivated to attempt to establish a synthesis of nature and grace. Catholicism presupposes that there is a common logos of philosophical knowledge and religious insight. [...] Protestantism typically interprets more radically the unique perspective of faith and emphasizes the indispensability of grace to religious knowledge. It gives priority to discontinuity [...] Characteristically, it rejects in principle any final synthesis of nature and grace." Nielsen, op. cit.)

Barth conditionally withdrew his objection "as the invention of the anti-Christ" for a version of analogia entis couched as God making himself known (as espoused by Gottlieb Söhngen student of Przywara and teacher of Joseph Ratzinger, Pope Benedict XVI.) Barth proposed what he called analogia relationalis then analogia fidei in response, including the idea that the only thing that God can be analogized from is Jesus and his humanity. (Note: "Unless there were some similarity with God, faith, man's response to revelation, would be impossible since revelation would be totally incomprehensible and alien to man.") It is the event of gratuitous faith that that actualizes analogy between God and man, not hints or images in pre-existing creation. "If analogia entis is interpreted as analogy of relation or analogy of faith, I will no longer say nasty things (about it)"

==== Eberhard Jüngel ====
Lutheran theologian Eberhard Jüngel has claimed the common Protestant objections (following from the early Barth view) tend to "miss the point of the so-called analogia entis entirely."

However, Jüngel ultimately rejects analogia entis as making God unapproachably distant. (Note: Art historian Mathew Milliner has commented "Once Protestants railed against the analogia entis because it made God too near. Now, Protestants rail against the analogia entis because it makes God too far away. One wonders, then, if this debate is telling us more about Protestant attitudes towards Catholicism than about the analogia entis itself.") He developed an "analogy of advent" based on God approaching humans.

==== Rowan Williams ====
For Welsh theologian Rowan Williams, the analogia entis is the proposition that "there is no system of which God and creatures are both part."

=== Islamic theology ===
According to theologian Joshua Ralston, medieval Sunni theologian Abu Hamid al-Ghazali's Al-Maqsad al-Asna (The 99 Beautiful Names of God) rejects analogia entis: "to speak rightly about God is emphatically to speak "after revelation"—so analogy and reason may be used, but only in light of what God has first revealed (in the Qur'an)."

== See also ==
- Analogy of Religion
- The Mind of the Maker
