= Paul Tillich =

German and American theologian and philosopher (1886–1965)

- Born: Paul Johannes Tillich; August 20, 1886; Starzeddel, Province of Brandenburg, Prussia, German Empire
- Died: October 22, 1965 (aged 79); Chicago, Illinois, U.S.
- Spouses: Grethi Wever (m. 1914, divorced); Hannah Werner-Gottschow (m. 1924)
- Children: 2

Academic background
- Education: University of Berlin; University of Tübingen; University of Halle-Wittenberg; University of Breslau
- Thesis: Mystik und Schuldbewusstsein in Schellings philosophischer Entwicklung (1911)

Academic work
- Language: English; German
- Main interests: Ontology; Philosophical theology; Existential analysis
- Notable works: Systematic Theology (1951–1963); The Courage to Be (1952)
- Notable ideas: See list: Method of correlation; Protestant principle and Catholic substance; Ground of being; New Being; Theology of culture; Kairos; Theonomy

Paul Johannes Tillich (/ˈtɪlɪk/; German: [ˈtɪlɪç]; August 20, 1886 – October 22, 1965) was a German and American Christian existentialist philosopher, religious socialist, and Lutheran theologian who was one of the most influential theologians of the twentieth century. Tillich taught at German universities before migrating to the United States in 1933, where he taught at Union Theological Seminary, Harvard University, and the University of Chicago.

For the general public, Tillich wrote the well-received The Courage to Be (1952) and Dynamics of Faith (1957). His major three-volume Systematic Theology (1951–1963) was well-received among theologians, and in many points it was an answer to existentialist critique of Christianity.

Tillich's work attracted scholarship from other influential thinkers like Karl Barth, Reinhold Niebuhr, H. Richard Niebuhr, George Lindbeck, Erich Przywara, James Luther Adams, Cardinal Avery Dulles, Dietrich Bonhoeffer, Sallie McFague, Richard John Neuhaus, David Novak, Thomas Merton, Michael Novak, and Martin Luther King Jr. According to H. Richard Niebuhr, "[t]he reading of Systematic Theology can be a great voyage of discovery into a rich and deep, and inclusive and yet elaborated, vision and understanding of human life in the presence of the mystery of God." John Herman Randall Jr. lauded the Systematic Theology as "beyond doubt the richest, most suggestive, and most challenging philosophical theology our day has produced."

Tillich also authored many works in ethics, the philosophy of history, and comparative religion. His ideas continue to be studied and discussed at international conferences and seminars.

== Biography ==
Tillich was born on August 20, 1886, in the small village of Starzeddel, Province of Brandenburg, then part of Germany (modern-day Starosiedle, Poland). He had two younger sisters. Tillich's Prussian father, Johannes Tillich, was a conservative Lutheran pastor of the Evangelical State Church of Prussia's older Provinces; his mother, Mathilde Dürselen, was from the Rhineland and more liberal.

When Tillich was four, his father was assigned to Bad Schönfliess (now Trzcińsko-Zdrój, Poland), a town of three thousand, where Tillich began primary school. In 1898, Tillich was sent to Königsberg in der Neumark (now Chojna, Poland) to begin his gymnasium schooling. He was billeted in a boarding house and lonely, so he read the Bible. At school, he discovered humanist ideas.

In 1900, Tillich's father was transferred to Berlin. Tillich switched to a Berlin school in 1901 and graduated in 1904. In September of the preceding year, his mother died of cancer; Tillich was 17. He attended several universities: the University of Berlin beginning in 1904; the University of Tübingen in 1905; and the University of Halle-Wittenberg from 1905 to 1907. He received his Doctor of Philosophy (PhD) degree at the University of Breslau in 1911 and his Licentiate in Theology at Halle-Wittenberg in 1912. His PhD dissertation at Breslau was on Schelling and the history of religion.

During his time at university, he became a member of the Wingolf Christian fraternities in Berlin, Tübingen, and Halle.

In 1912, Tillich was ordained as a Lutheran minister in the Province of Brandenburg. On 28 September 1914, he married Margarethe ("Grethi") Wever (1888–1968), and in October he joined the Imperial German Army as a chaplain during World War I. Grethi deserted Tillich in 1919 after an affair that produced a child not fathered by Tillich; the two then divorced. During the war, Tillich served as a chaplain in the trenches; he buried his closest friend and numerous soldiers in the mud of France. He was hospitalized three times for combat trauma, and was awarded the Iron Cross for bravery under fire. He came home from the war shattered. Tillich's academic career began after the war; he became a Privatdozent of Theology at the University of Berlin, a post he held from 1919 to 1924. On his return from the war, he met Hannah Werner-Gottschow (then married and pregnant). In March 1924, they married; it was the second marriage for both. She later wrote a book entitled From Time to Time about their life together (including their open marriage). Although their lifestyle was upsetting to some, they remained together into old age.

From 1924 to 1925, Tillich served as an associate professor of theology at the University of Marburg, where he began to develop his systematic theology, teaching a course on it during the last of his three terms. While at Marburg, Tillich developed a professional relationship with both Rudolf Bultmann and Martin Heidegger. From 1925 until 1929, Tillich was a professor of theology at the Dresden University of Technology and the University of Leipzig. Then, succeeding Max Scheler (who had died suddenly in 1928), Tillich held the post of professor of philosophy and sociology at the University of Frankfurt from 1929 to 1933. While at Frankfurt Tillich's two assistants (both completing their doctorates under him) were Harald Poelchau and Theodor Adorno (in 1931 Leo Strauss had applied for the same position but was rejected). During that period Tillich also "was instrumental in hiring Max Horkheimer as the Director of the Institut für Sozialforschung and to a professorship in sociology at the University of Frankfurt." In Winter Term 1930-31 Tillich and Horkheimer together team-taught a course on John Locke; and during the several terms to immediately follow Tillich and Adorno together led seminars on Georg Simmel, Gotthold Ephraim Lessing, and Georg Wilhelm Friedrich Hegel. Along the way Tillich also remained in conversation with Erich Przywara.

While at the University of Frankfurt, Tillich traveled throughout Germany giving public lectures and speeches that brought him into conflict with the Nazi movement. Ten weeks after Adolf Hitler became German Chancellor, on 13 April 1933 Tillich, along with Karl Mannheim and Max Horkheimer, were among the "first batch" of prominent German academic "enemies of the Reich" to be summarily dismissed from their tenured positions for solely ideological and/or racial reasons. Reinhold Niebuhr visited Germany in the summer of 1933 and, already impressed with Tillich's writings (they had known one another since 1919), contacted Tillich upon learning of his dismissal. Niebuhr urged Tillich to join the faculty at New York City's Union Theological Seminary; Tillich accepted.

At the age of 47, Tillich moved with his family to the United States. This meant learning English, the language in which he would eventually publish works such as the Systematic Theology. From 1933 until 1955 he taught at Union Theological Seminary in New York, where he began as a visiting professor of philosophy of religion. During 1933–34 he was also a visiting lecturer in philosophy at Columbia University. Remarkably, "the faculty of Union [had] agreed to a 5% pay cut, at the height of the Great Depression, to bring the 47-year old Tillich and his family to the U.S."

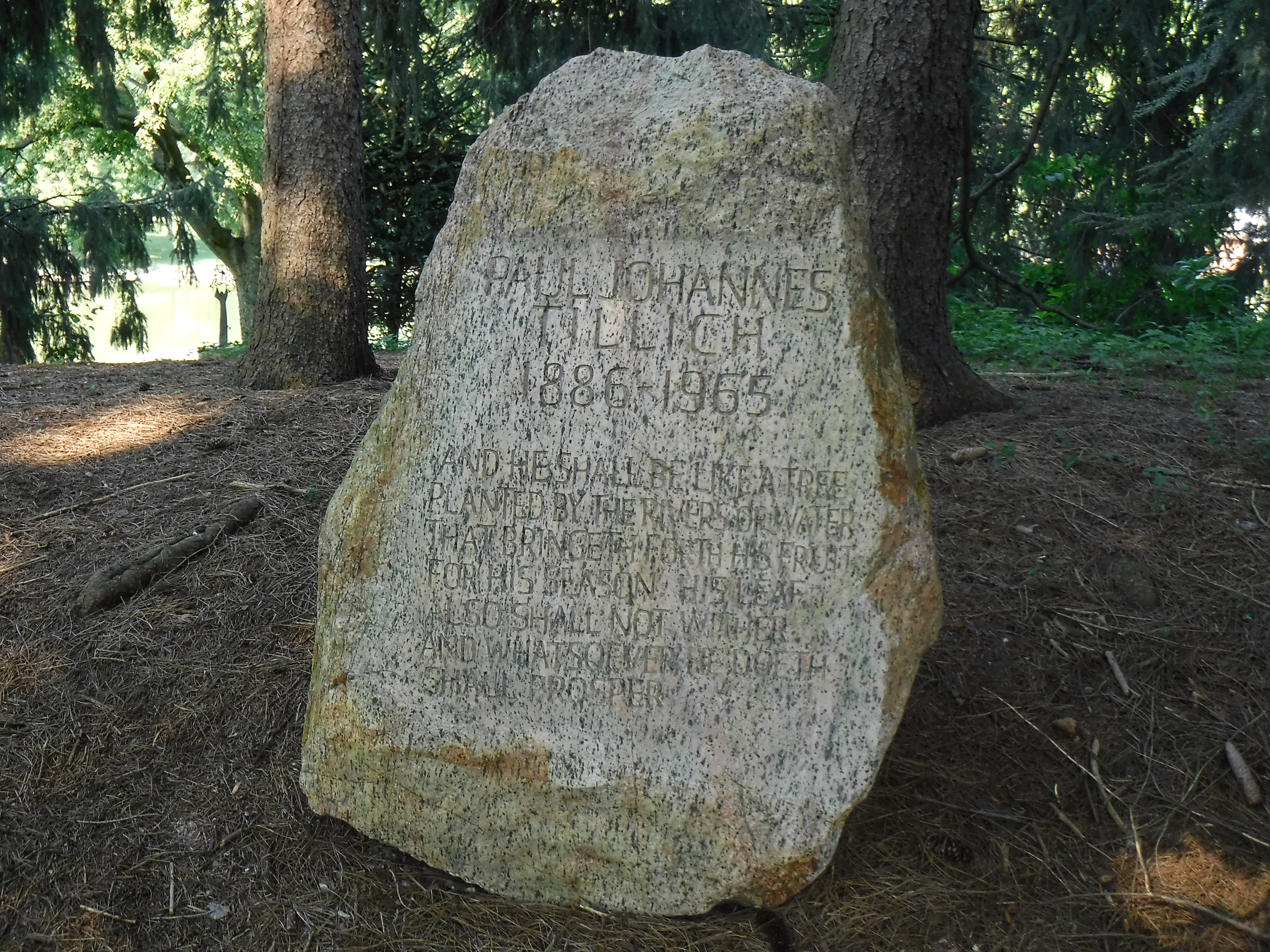
Tillich's gravestone in Paul Tillich Park, New Harmony, Indiana. The quotation is from Psalm 1:3.

Tillich acquired tenure at the Union Theological Seminary in 1937, and in 1940 he was promoted to professor of philosophical theology and became an American citizen. At Union, Tillich earned his reputation, publishing a series of books that outlined his idiosyncratic synthesis of Protestant Christian theology and existential philosophy. He published On the Boundary in 1936; The Protestant Era, a collection of his essays, in 1948; and The Shaking of the Foundations, the first of three volumes of his sermons, also in 1948. His collections of sermons gave him a broader audience than he had yet experienced.

Tillich's most heralded achievements, though, were the 1951 publication of volume one of the Systematic Theology (University of Chicago Press), and the 1952 publication of The Courage to Be (Yale University Press). The first volume of the systematic theology examines the inner tensions in the structure of reason and being, primarily through a study in ontology. These tensions, Tillich contends, show that the quest for revelation is implied in finite reason, and that the quest for the ground of being is implied in finite being. The publication of Systematic Theology, Vol. 1 brought Tillich international academic acclaim, prompting an invitation to give the prestigious Gifford Lectures in 1953–54 at the University of Aberdeen. The Courage to Be, which examines ontic, moral, and spiritual anxieties across history and in modernity, was based on Tillich's 1950 Dwight H. Terry Lectureship and reached a wide general readership.

These works led to an appointment at Harvard Divinity School in 1955, where he was university professor, among the (at the time) five highest ranking professors at Harvard. He was primarily a professor of undergraduates, because Harvard did not have a department of religion for them, but was thereby more exposed to the wider university and "most fully embodied the ideal of a University Professor." In 1959, Tillich was featured on the cover of Time magazine.

In 1961, Tillich became one of the founding members of the Society for the Arts, Religion and Contemporary Culture, an organization with which he maintained ties for the remainder of his life. During this period, he published volume two of the Systematic Theology, as well as the popular book Dynamics of Faith, both in 1957. Tillich's career at Harvard lasted until 1962, when he was appointed John Nuveen Professor of Theology at the University of Chicago. He remained at Chicago until his death in 1965.

Volume three of Tillich's Systematic Theology was published in 1963. In 1964, Tillich became the first theologian to be honored in Kegley and Bretall's Library of Living Theology: "The adjective 'great,' in our opinion, can be applied to very few thinkers of our time, but Tillich, we are far from alone in believing, stands unquestionably amongst these few." A widely quoted critical assessment of his importance was Georgia Harkness' comment: "What Whitehead was to American philosophy, Tillich has been to American theology."

Tillich died on October 22, 1965, ten days after having a heart attack. In 1966, his ashes were interred in the Paul Tillich Park in New Harmony, Indiana. His gravestone inscription reads: "And he shall be like a tree planted by the rivers of water, that bringeth forth his fruit for his season, his leaf also shall not wither. And whatsoever he doeth shall prosper." (Psalm 1:3)

== Philosophy and theology ==
=== Being ===
Tillich used the concept of being (Sein) throughout his philosophical and theological work. Some of his work engaged with the fundamental ontology of Martin Heidegger.

For "being" remains the content, the mystery, and the eternal aporia of thinking. No theology can suppress the notion of being as the power of being. One cannot separate them. In the moment in which one says that God is or that he has being, the question arises as to how his relation to being is understood. The only possible answer seems to be that God is being-itself, in the sense of the power of being or the power to conquer nonbeing.

— Tillich

Tillich's preliminary analysis of being ascends from the human subject's asking of the ontological question ("What is being itself?"), upwards to the highest categories of metaphysics. He distinguishes among four levels of ontological analysis: self-world; dynamics and form, freedom and destiny, and individualization and participation; essential being and existential being; and time, space, causality, and substance.

Being plays a key role throughout Tillich's Systematic Theology. In the opening to the second volume, Tillich writes:

When a doctrine of God is initiated by defining God as being-itself, the philosophical concept of being is introduced into systematic theology ... It appears in the present system in three places: in the doctrine of God, where God is called the being as being or the ground and the power of being; in the doctrine of man, where the distinction is carried through between man's essential and his existential being; and finally, in the doctrine of the Christ, where he is called the manifestation of the New Being, the actualization of which is the work of the divine Spirit.

— Tillich

=== God as the ground of being ===
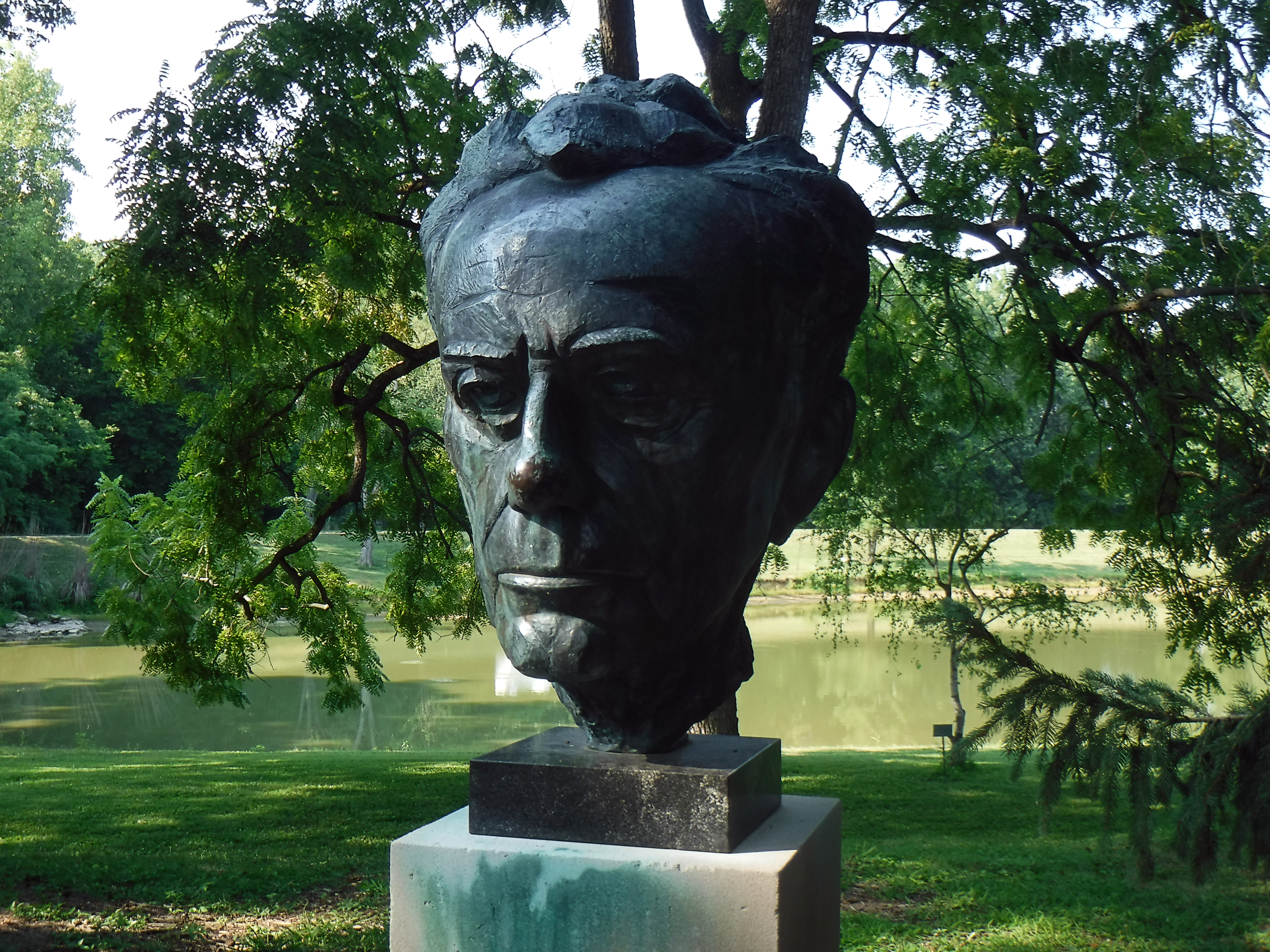
Bust of Tillich by James Rosati in New Harmony, Indiana

Throughout most of his work Tillich provides an ontological view of God as being-itself, the ground of being, and the power of being, one in which God is beyond essence and existence. He was critical of conceptions of God as a being (e.g., the highest being), as well as of pantheistic conceptions of God as universal essence. Traditional medieval philosophical theology in the work of figures such as St. Anselm, Duns Scotus, and William of Ockham tended to understand God as the highest existing being, to which predicates such as omnipotence, omniscience, omnipresence, goodness, righteousness, holiness, etc. may be ascribed. Arguments for and against the existence of God presuppose such an understanding of God. Tillich is critical of this mode of discourse, which he refers to as "theological theism," and argues that if God is a being, even if the highest being, God cannot be properly called the source of all being. With respect to both God's existence and essence, moreover, Tillich shows how difficulties beset Thomas Aquinas' attempt to "maintain the truth that God is beyond essence and existence while simultaneously arguing for the existence of God."

Though Tillich is critical of propositional arguments for the existence of God as found in natural theology, as he considers them objectifying of God, he nonetheless affirms the reality of God as the ground of being. A similar line of thought is found in the work of Eric Voegelin. Tillich's concept of God can be drawn out from his analysis of being. In Tillich's analysis of being, all of being experiences the threat of nonbeing. Yet, following Heidegger, Tillich claims that it is human beings alone who can raise the question of being and therefore of being-itself. This is because, he contends, human beings' "infinite self-transcendence is an expression of [their] belonging to that which is beyond nonbeing, namely, to being-itself ... Being-itself manifests itself to finite being in the infinite drive of the finite beyond itself."

Tillich addresses questions both ontological and personalist concerning God. One issue deals with whether and in what way personal language about the nature of God and humanity's relationship to God is appropriate. In distinction to "theological theism", Tillich refers to another kind of theism as that of the "divine-human encounter". Such is the theism of the encounter with the "Wholly Other" ("Das ganz Andere"), as in the work of Karl Barth and Rudolf Otto. It implies a personalism with regard to God's self-revelation. Tillich is quite clear that this is both appropriate and necessary, as it is the basis of the personalism of biblical religion altogether and of the concept of the "Word of God", but can become falsified if the theologian tries to turn such encounters with God as the Wholly Other into an understanding of God as a being. In other words, God is both personal and transpersonal.

Tillich's ontological view of God has precedent in Christian theology. In addition to affinities with the concept of God as being-itself in classical theism, it shares similarities with Hellenistic and Patristic conceptions of God as the "unoriginate source" (agennetos) of all being. This view was espoused in particular by Origen, one of a number of early theologians whose thought influenced Tillich's. Their views in turn had pre-Christian precedents in middle Platonism. Aside from classical and Christian influences in Tillich's concept of God, there is a dynamism in Tillich's notion of "the living God," reflecting some influence from Spinoza.

Tillich combines his ontological conception of God with a largely existential and phenomenological understanding of faith in God, remarking that God is "the answer to the question implied in man's finitude ... the name for that which concerns man ultimately." This is notably manifest in his understanding of faith as ultimate concern. Following his existential analysis, Tillich further argues that theological theism is not only logically problematic, but is unable to speak into the situation of radical doubt and despair about meaning in life. This issue, he said, was of primary concern in the modern age, as opposed to anxiety about fate, guilt, death and condemnation. This is because the state of finitude entails by necessity anxiety, and that it is our finitude as human beings, our being a mixture of being and nonbeing, that is at the ultimate basis of anxiety. If God is not the ground of being, then God cannot provide an answer to the question of finitude; God would also be finite in some sense. The term "God Above God," then, means to indicate the God who appears, who is the ground of being, when the "God" of theological theism has disappeared in the anxiety of doubt. While on the one hand this God goes beyond the God of theism as usually defined, it finds expression in many religious symbols of the Christian faith, particularly that of the crucified Christ. The possibility thus exists, says Tillich, that religious symbols may be recovered which would otherwise have been rendered ineffective by contemporary society.

Tillich argues that the God of theological theism is at the root of much revolt against theism and religious faith in the modern period. Tillich states, sympathetically, that the God of theological theism

deprives me of my subjectivity because he is all-powerful and all-knowing. I revolt and make him into an object, but the revolt fails and becomes desperate. God appears as the invincible tyrant, the being in contrast with whom all other beings are without freedom and subjectivity. He is equated with the recent tyrants who with the help of terror try to transform everything into a mere object, a thing among things, a cog in a machine they control. He becomes the model of everything against which Existentialism revolted. This is the God Nietzsche said had to be killed because nobody can tolerate being made into a mere object of absolute knowledge and absolute control. This is the deepest root of atheism. It is an atheism which is justified as the reaction against theological theism and its disturbing implications.

Another reason Tillich criticized theological theism was because it placed God into the subject-object dichotomy. The subject-object dichotomy is the basic distinction made in epistemology. Epistemologically, God cannot be made into an object, that is, an object of the knowing subject. Tillich deals with this question under the rubric of the relationality of God. The question is "whether there are external relations between God and the creature". Traditionally Christian theology has always understood the doctrine of creation to mean precisely this external relationality between God, the Creator, and the creature as separate and not identical realities. Tillich reminds us of the point, which can be found in Luther, that "there is no place to which man can withdraw from the divine thou, because it includes the ego and is nearer to the ego than the ego to itself".

Tillich goes further to say that the desire to draw God into the subject–object dichotomy is an "insult" to the divine holiness. Similarly, if God were made into the subject rather than the object of knowledge (The Ultimate Subject), then the rest of existing entities then become subjected to the absolute knowledge and scrutiny of God, and the human being is "reified," or made into a mere object. It would deprive the person of his or her own subjectivity and creativity. According to Tillich, theological theism has provoked the rebellions found in atheism and Existentialism, although other social factors such as the Industrial Revolution have also contributed to the "reification" of the human being. The modern man could no longer tolerate the idea of being an "object" completely subjected to the absolute knowledge of God. Tillich argued, as mentioned, that theological theism is "bad theology".

The God of the theological theism is a being besides others and as such a part of the whole reality. He is certainly considered its most important part, but as a part and therefore as subjected to the structure of the whole. He is supposed to be beyond the ontological elements and categories which constitute reality. But every statement subjects him to them. He is seen as a self which has a world, as an ego which relates to a thought, as a cause which is separated from its effect, as having a definite space and endless time. He is a being, not being-itself

Alternatively, Tillich presents the above-mentioned ontological view of God as Being-Itself, Ground of Being, Power of Being, and occasionally as Abyss or God's "Abysmal Being". What makes Tillich's ontological view of God different from theological theism is that it transcends it by being the foundation or ultimate reality that "precedes" all beings. Just as Being for Heidegger is ontologically prior to conception, Tillich views God to be beyond being. God is not a supernatural entity among other entities. Instead, God is the inexhaustible ground which empowers the existence of beings. We cannot perceive God as an object which is related to a subject because God precedes the subject–object dichotomy.

Thus Tillich dismisses a literalistic Biblicism. Instead of rejecting the notion of personal God, however, Tillich sees it as a symbol that points directly to the Ground of Being. Since the Ground of Being ontologically precedes reason, it cannot be comprehended since comprehension presupposes the subject–object dichotomy. Tillich disagreed with any literal philosophical and religious statements that can be made about God. Such literal statements attempt to define God and lead not only to anthropomorphism but also to a philosophical mistake that Immanuel Kant warned against, that setting limits against the transcendent inevitably leads to contradictions. Any statements about God are simply symbolic, but these symbols are sacred in the sense that they function to participate or point to the Ground of Being.

Tillich also further elaborated the thesis of the God above the God of theism in his Systematic Theology.

... (the God above the God of theism) This has been misunderstood as a dogmatic statement of a pantheistic or mystical character. First of all, it is not a dogmatic, but an apologetic, statement. It takes seriously the radical doubt experienced by many people. It gives one the courage of self-affirmation even in the extreme state of radical doubt.

— Tillich, Systematic Theology Vol. 2, p. 12

... In such a state the God of both religious and theological language disappears. But something remains, namely, the seriousness of that doubt in which meaning within meaninglessness is affirmed. The source of this affirmation of meaning within meaninglessness, of certitude within doubt, is not the God of traditional theism but the "God above God," the power of being, which works through those who have no name for it, not even the name God.

— Tillich, Systematic Theology Vol. 2, p. 12

... This is the answer to those who ask for a message in the nothingness of their situation and at the end of their courage to be. But such an extreme point is not a space with which one can live. The dialectics of an extreme situation are a criterion of truth but not the basis on which a whole structure of truth can be built.

— Tillich, Systematic Theology Vol. 2, p.12

=== Method of correlation ===
The key to understanding Tillich's theology is what he calls the "method of correlation." It is an approach that correlates insights from Christian revelation with the issues raised by existential, psychological, and philosophical analyses.

Tillich states in the introduction to the Systematic Theology:

Theology formulates the questions implied in human existence, and theology formulates the answers implied in divine self-manifestation under the guidance of the questions implied in human existence. This is a circle which drives man to a point where question and answer are not separated. This point, however, is not a moment in time.

The Christian message provides the answers to the questions implied in human existence. These answers are contained in the revelatory events on which Christianity is based and are taken by systematic theology from the sources, through the medium, under the norm. Their content cannot be derived from questions that would come from an analysis of human existence. They are 'spoken' to human existence from beyond it, in a sense. Otherwise, they would not be answers, for the question is human existence itself.

For Tillich, the existential questions of human existence are associated with the field of philosophy and, more specifically, ontology (the study of being). This is because, according to Tillich, a lifelong pursuit of philosophy reveals that the central question of every philosophical inquiry always comes back to the question of being, or what it means to be, and, consequently, what it means to be a finite human being within being. To be correlated with existential questions are theological answers, themselves derived from Christian revelation. The task of the philosopher primarily involves developing the questions, whereas the task of the theologian primarily involves developing the answers to these questions. However, it should be remembered that the two tasks overlap and include one another: the theologian must be somewhat of a philosopher and vice versa, for Tillich's notion of faith as "ultimate concern" necessitates that the theological answer be correlated with, compatible with, and in response to the general ontological question which must be developed independently from the answers. Thus, on one side of the correlation lies an ontological analysis of the human situation, whereas on the other is a presentation of the Christian message as a response to this existential dilemma. For Tillich, no formulation of the question can contradict the theological answer. This is because the Christian message claims, a priori, that the logos "who became flesh" is also the universal logos of the Greeks.

In addition to the intimate relationship between philosophy and theology, another important aspect of the method of correlation is Tillich's distinction between form and content in the theological answers. While the nature of revelation determines the actual content of the theological answers, the character of the questions determines the form of these answers. This is because, for Tillich, theology must be an answering theology, or apologetic theology. God is called the "ground of being" in part because God is the answer to the ontological threat of non-being, and this characterization of the theological answer in philosophical terms means that the answer has been conditioned (insofar as its form is considered) by the question. Throughout the Systematic Theology, Tillich is careful to maintain this distinction between form and content without allowing one to be inadvertently conditioned by the other. Many criticisms of Tillich's methodology revolve around this issue of whether the integrity of the Christian message is really maintained when its form is conditioned by philosophy.

The theological answer is also determined by the sources of theology, our experience, and the norm of theology. Though the form of the theological answers are determined by the character of the question, these answers (which "are contained in the revelatory events on which Christianity is based") are also "taken by systematic theology from the sources, through the medium, under the norm." There are three main sources of systematic theology: the Bible, Church history, and the history of religion and culture. Experience is not a source but a medium through which the sources speak. And the norm of theology is that by which both sources and experience are judged with regard to the content of the Christian faith. Thus, we have the following as elements of the method and structure of systematic theology:

- Sources of theology
  - Bible
  - Church history
  - History of religion and culture
- Medium of the sources
  - Collective experience of the Church
- Norm of theology (determines use of sources)
  - Content of which is the biblical message itself, for example:
    - Justification through faith
    - New Being in Jesus as the Christ
    - The Protestant principle
    - The criterion of the cross

As McKelway explains, the sources of theology contribute to the formation of the norm, which then becomes the criterion through which the sources and experience are judged. The relationship is circular, as it is the present situation which conditions the norm in the interaction between church and biblical message. The norm is then subject to change, but Tillich insists that its basic content remains the same: that of the biblical message. It is tempting to conflate revelation with the norm, but we must keep in mind that revelation (whether original or dependent) is not an element of the structure of systematic theology per se, but an event. For Tillich, the present-day norm is the "New Being in Jesus as the Christ as our Ultimate Concern". This is because the present question is one of estrangement, and the overcoming of this estrangement is what Tillich calls the "New Being". But since Christianity answers the question of estrangement with "Jesus as the Christ", the norm tells us that we find the New Being in Jesus as the Christ.

There is also the question of the validity of the method of correlation. Certainly one could reject the method on the grounds that there is no a priori reason for its adoption. But Tillich claims that the method of any theology and its system are interdependent. That is, an absolute methodological approach cannot be adopted because the method is continually being determined by the system and the objects of theology.

=== Life and the Spirit ===
This is part four of Tillich's Systematic Theology. In this part, Tillich talks about life and the divine Spirit.

Life remains ambiguous as long as there is life. The question implied in the ambiguities of life derives to a new question, namely, that of the direction in which life moves. This is the question of history. Systematically speaking, history, characterized as it is by its direction toward the future, is the dynamic quality of life. Therefore, the "riddle of history" is a part of the problem of life.

=== Absolute faith ===
Tillich stated the courage to take meaninglessness into oneself presupposes a relation to the ground of being: absolute faith. Absolute faith can transcend the theistic idea of God, and has three elements.

... The first element is the experience of the power of being which is present even in the face of the most radical manifestation of non being. If one says that in this experience vitality resists despair, one must add that vitality in man is proportional to intentionality. The vitality that can stand the abyss of meaninglessness is aware of a hidden meaning within the destruction of meaning.

— Tillich, The Courage to Be, p.177

The second element in absolute faith is the dependence of the experience of nonbeing on the experience of being and the dependence of the experience of meaninglessness on the experience of meaning. Even in the state of despair one has enough being to make despair possible.

— Tillich, The Courage to Be, p.177

There is a third element in absolute faith, the acceptance of being accepted. Of course, in the state of despair there is nobody and nothing that accepts. But there is the power of acceptance itself which is experienced. Meaninglessness, as long as it is experienced, includes an experience of the "power of acceptance". To accept this power of acceptance consciously is the religious answer of absolute faith, of a faith which has been deprived by doubt of any concrete content, which nevertheless is faith and the source of the most paradoxical manifestation of the courage to be.

— Tillich, The Courage to Be, p.177

=== Faith as ultimate concern ===
According to the Stanford Encyclopedia of Philosophy, Tillich believes the essence of religious attitudes is what he calls "ultimate concern". Separate from all profane and ordinary realities, the object of the concern is understood as sacred, numinous or holy. The perception of its reality is felt as so overwhelming and valuable that all else seems insignificant, and for this reason requires total surrender. In 1957, Tillich defined his conception of faith more explicitly in his work, Dynamics of Faith.

Man, like every living being, is concerned about many things, above all about those which condition his very existence ... If [a situation or concern] claims ultimacy it demands the total surrender of him who accepts this claim ... it demands that all other concerns ... be sacrificed.

Tillich further refined his conception of faith by stating that, "Faith as ultimate concern is an act of the total personality. It is the most centered act of the human mind ... it participates in the dynamics of personal life."

An arguably central component of Tillich's concept of faith is his notion that faith is "ecstatic". That is to say:

It transcends both the drives of the nonrational unconsciousness and the structures of the rational conscious ... the ecstatic character of faith does not exclude its rational character although it is not identical with it, and it includes nonrational strivings without being identical with them. 'Ecstasy' means 'standing outside of oneself' – without ceasing to be oneself – with all the elements which are united in the personal center.

In short, for Tillich, faith does not stand opposed to rational or nonrational elements (reason and emotion respectively), as some philosophers would maintain. Rather, it transcends them in an ecstatic passion for the ultimate.

It should also be noted that Tillich does not exclude atheists in his exposition of faith. Everyone has an ultimate concern, and this concern can be in an act of faith, "even if the act of faith includes the denial of God. Where there is ultimate concern, God can be denied only in the name of God"

=== Tillich's ontology of courage ===
In Paul Tillich's work The Courage to Be he defines courage as the self-affirmation of one's being in spite of a threat of nonbeing. He relates courage to anxiety, anxiety being the threat of non-being and the courage to be what we use to combat that threat. For Tillich, he outlines three types of anxiety and thus three ways to display the courage to be.

1) The Anxiety of Fate and Death a. The Anxiety of Fate and Death is the most basic and universal form of anxiety for Tillich. It relates quite simply to the recognition of our mortality. This troubles us humans. We become anxious when we are unsure whether our actions create a causal damnation which leads to a very real and quite unavoidable death (42-44). "Nonbeing threatens man's ontic self-affirmation, relatively in terms of fate, absolutely in terms of death" (41). b. We display courage when we cease to rely on others to tell us what will come of us, (what will happen when we die etc.) and begin seeking those answers out for ourselves. Called the "courage of confidence" (162-63).

2) The Anxiety of Guilt and Condemnation a. This anxiety afflicts our moral self-affirmation. We as humans are responsible for our moral being, and when asked by our judge (whoever that may be) what we have made of ourselves we must answer. The anxiety is produced when we realize our being is unsatisfactory. "It [Nonbeing] threatens man's moral self-affirmation, relatively in terms of guilt, absolutely in terms of condemnation" (41). b. We display courage when we first identify our sin; despair or whatever is causing us guilt or afflicting condemnation. We then rely on the idea that we are accepted regardless. "The courage to be is the courage to accept oneself as accepted in spite of being unacceptable" (164).

3) The Anxiety of Meaninglessness and Emptiness a. The Anxiety of Meaninglessness and Emptiness attacks our being as a whole. We worry about the loss of an ultimate concern or goal. This anxiety is also brought on by a loss of spirituality. We as beings feel the threat of non-being when we feel we have no place or purpose in the world. "It [Nonbeing] threatens man's spiritual self-affirmation, relatively in terms of emptiness, absolutely in terms of meaninglessness" (41). b. We display the courage to be when facing this anxiety by displaying true faith, and by again, self-affirming oneself. We draw from the "power of being" which is God for Tillich and use that faith to in turn affirm ourselves and negate the non-being. We can find our meaning and purpose through the "power of being" (172-73).

Tillich writes that the ultimate source of the courage to be is the "God above God," which transcends the theistic idea of God and is the content of absolute faith (defined as "the accepting of the acceptance without somebody or something that accepts") (185).

== Political views ==
Tillich espoused socialist politics, and became involved in religious socialist circles after World War I. He co-wrote a pamphlet in 1919 which advocated that Christian leaders with socialist leanings should "enter into the socialist movement in order to pave the way for a future union of Christianity and the socialist social order". The Fellowship of Socialist Christians was organized in the early 1930s by Reinhold Niebuhr and others with similar views. Later it changed its name to Frontier Fellowship and then to Christian Action. The main supporters of the Fellowship in the early days included Tillich, Eduard Heimann, Sherwood Eddy and Rose Terlin. In its early days the group thought capitalist individualism was incompatible with Christian ethics. Although not Communist, the group acknowledged Karl Marx's social philosophy. Tillich was sympathetic towards the young Marx's theory of alienation as well as his idea of historical materialism, but was opposed to rigid understandings of historical determinism that claimed the victory of socialism was inevitable, as espoused by many vulgar Marxists.

Tillich's book The Socialist Decision was published in the early 1930s, during the rise of Nazism, and it was immediately censored by the Nazi regime. In the book, Tillich characterised Nazism as a form of political romanticism, which he defined as an attachment to a "myth of origin (that) envisions the beginnings of humankind in elemental, superhuman figures of various kinds" that he contended formed the basis for right-wing politics more generally. Tillich identified three basic origin myths in romantic politics: blood, soil and social group. He argued that these origin myths served to legitimate established social hierarchies by idealising the past and promoting a cyclical view of history that denied the possibility of progress and enlightened reform: "the origin (myth) embodies the law of cyclical motion: whatever proceeds from it must return to it. Wherever the origin is in control, nothing new can happen". He also contended that whilst political romanticism could be critical of capitalism and industrial society, it could still be used by the capitalist class to advance their interests. Tillich more precisely described Nazism as form of revolutionary romanticism, which he counterposed to conservative romanticism. He stated that whilst the latter "defend(s) the spiritual and social residues of the bond of origin... and whenever possible (seeks) to restore past forms", the former "tries to gain a basis for new ties to the origin by a devastating attack on the rational system".

Tillich viewed liberalism as intertwined with capitalism, arguing that it granted freedom to the capitalist class without liberating the masses, and believing it had a key role in dismantling traditional social bonds, including religious ones, as well as advancing colonialism and slavery. However, he was positive about liberalism's individualism, rationalism and egalitarianism, and believed that it was inseparable from democracy, despite tensions between the two. He considered that the connection between liberalism and capitalism needed to be severed in order for liberalism's aspirations for freedom to be realised, advocating for an embrace of democratic socialism as an alternative.

== Popular works ==
Two of Tillich's works, The Courage to Be (1952) and Dynamics of Faith (1957), were read widely, including by people who would not normally read religious books. In The Courage to Be, he lists three basic anxieties: anxiety about our biological finitude, i.e. that arising from the knowledge that we will eventually die; anxiety about our moral finitude, linked to guilt; and anxiety about our existential finitude, a sense of aimlessness in life. Tillich related these to three different historical eras: the early centuries of the Christian era; the Reformation; and the 20th century. Tillich's popular works have influenced psychology as well as theology, having had an influence on Rollo May, whose "The Courage to Create" was inspired by "The Courage to Be".

== Reception ==
Tillich's most enduring legacy may be his spiritually-oriented public instruction. Tillich's chapel sermons (especially at Union) were enthusiastically received. He was the only faculty member at Union willing to attend the revivals of Billy Graham. Tillich's students commented on his approachability and interaction with them. Tillich along with his student, psychologist Rollo May, was an early leader at the Esalen Institute. New Age catchphrases describing God spatially as the "Ground of Being" and temporally as the "Eternal Now," in tandem with the view that God is not an entity among entities but rather is "Being-Itself"—ideas which Eckhart Tolle invoked repeatedly throughout his career—were renovated by Tillich, although these ideas derive from Christian mystics and early theologians such as St. Augustine and St. Thomas Aquinas.

A consideration of Tillich's traumatic experiences as an active duty chaplain during World War I has led some to view his theology as "Post-traumatic." The book Post-Traumatic God: How the Church Cares for People Who Have Been to Hell and Back explores Tillich's experiences and theology to offer people afflicted with post-traumatic stress an understanding of God aimed at helping them heal.

=== Criticism ===
Martin Buber's disciple Malcolm Diamond claims Tillich's approach indicates a "transtheistic position that Buber seeks to avoid", reducing God to the impersonal "necessary being" of Thomas Aquinas.

Tillich has been criticized from the Barthian wing of Protestantism for what is alleged to be correlation theory's tendency to reduce God and his relationship to man to anthropocentric terms. Tillich countered that Barth's approach to theology denies the "possibility of understanding God's relation to man in any other way than heteronomously or extrinsically". Defenders of Tillich claim that the critics misunderstood the distinction Tillich made between God's unknowable essence as the unconditional "Ground of Being", and how God reveals himself to mankind in existence. Tillich established the distinction in the first chapter of Systematic Theology Volume One: "But though God in his abysmal nature [footnote: 'Calvin: in his essence' ] is in no way dependent on man, God in his self manifestation to man is dependent on the way man receives his manifestation."

Some conservative forms of evangelical Christianity believe Tillich's thought is too unorthodox to qualify as Christianity at all, but rather is a form of pantheism or atheism. The Evangelical Dictionary of Theology states, "At best Tillich was a pantheist, but his thought borders on atheism." Defenders of Tillich counter such claims by pointing to clear monotheistic expressions from a classical Christian viewpoint, of the relationship between God and man, such as his description of the experience of grace in his sermon "You Are Accepted".

== Works ==
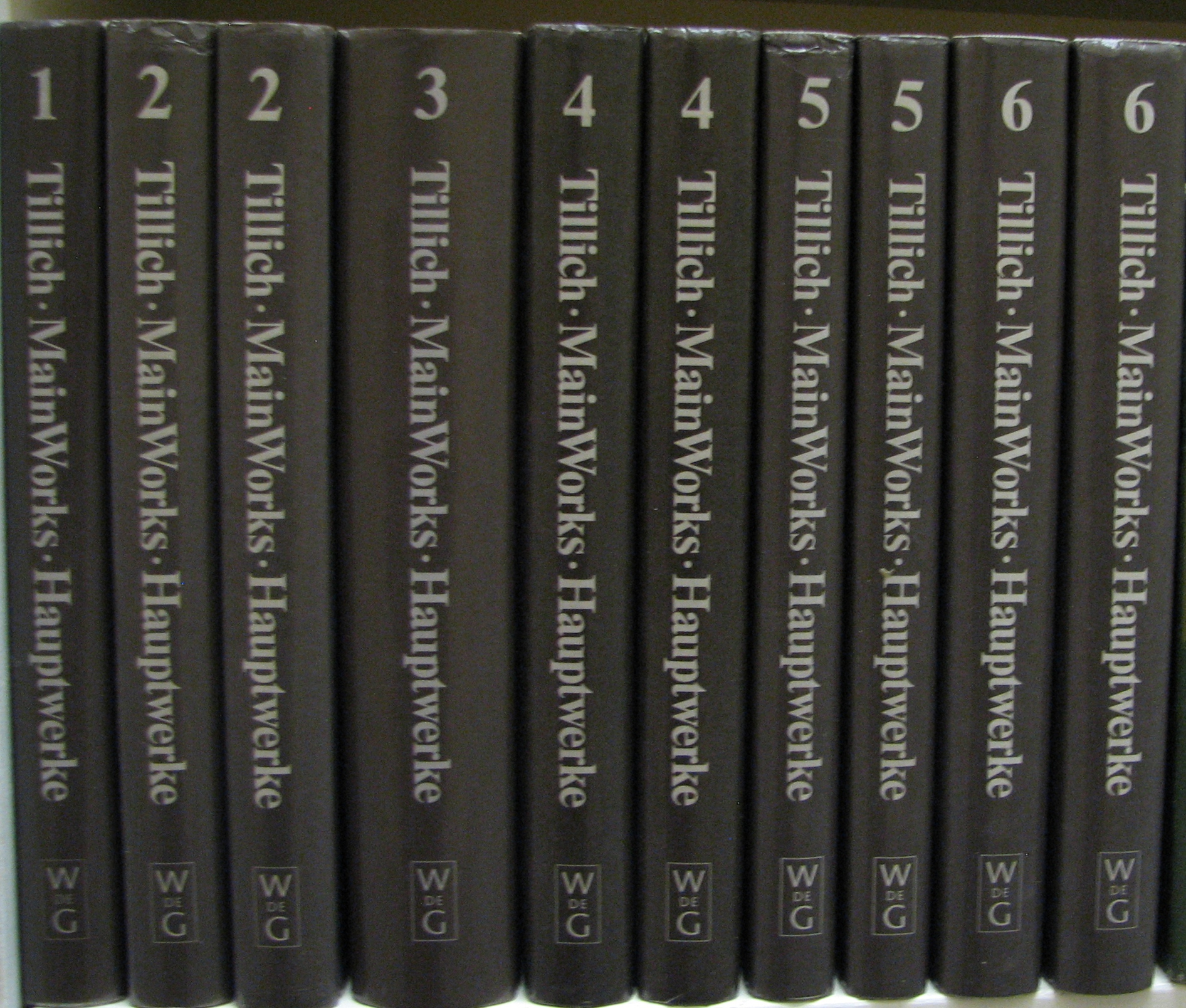
A set of Paul Tillich's Main Works – Hauptwerke

- Tillich, Paul (1974), Mysticism and Guilt-Consciousness in Schelling's Philosophical Development, Bucknell University Press ISBN 978-0-83871493-5
- ——— (1956) [1925, Die religiöse Lage der Gegenwart; Holt 1932], The Religious Situation, Meridian Press, archived from the original on 26 November 2005.
- ——— (c. 1977) [1933, Die Sozialistische Entscheidung; Alfred Protte, Potsdam 1933; new edition: Medusa, Berlin, 1980], The Socialist Decision, New York: Harper & Row.
- ——— (1936), The Interpretation of History, archived from the original on 26 November 2005.
- ——— (1948), The Protestant Era, The University of Chicago Press, archived from the original on 26 November 2005.
- ——— (1948), The Shaking of the Foundations (sermon collection), Charles Scribner's Sons, archived from the original on 26 November 2005.
- ——— (1951–1963). Systematic Theology (in 3 volumes). Chicago, IL: University of Chicago Press.
  - ——— (1951), Systematic Theology, vol. 1, University of Chicago Press ISBN 978-0-22680337-1.
  - ——— (1957a), Systematic Theology, vol. 2: Existence and the Christ, University of Chicago Press ISBN 978-0-22680338-8.
  - ——— (1963), Systematic Theology, vol. 3: Life and the Spirit: History and the Kingdom of God, University of Chicago Press ISBN 978-0-22680339-5
- ——— (1952), The Courage to Be, Yale University Press ISBN 978-0-30017002-3.
- ——— (1954), Love, Power, and Justice: Ontological Analysis and Ethical Applications, Oxford University Press ISBN 978-0-19500222-5
- ——— (1955), Biblical Religion and the Search for Ultimate Reality, University Of Chicago Press ISBN 978-0-22680341-8
- ——— (July 1955b). "What is Truth?" (PDF). The Canadian Journal of Theology. I (2): 117–122.
- ——— (2006) [1955, Charles Scribner's Sons], The New Being (sermon collection), introd. by Mary Ann Stenger, Bison Press, ISBN 978-0-80329458-5, Religion online.
- ——— (1957b), Dynamics of Faith, Harper & Row ISBN 978-0-06203146-4
- ——— (1959), Theology of Culture, Oxford University Press x ISBN 978-0-19976353-5
- ——— (1963), Christianity and the Encounter of the World Religions, Columbia University Press, archived from the original on 26 November 2005.
- ——— (1995) [1963, Harper & Row], Morality and Beyond, Westminster John Knox Press, ISBN 978-0-664-25564-0.
- ——— (2003) [1963, Charles Scribner's Sons], The Eternal Now (university sermons 1955–63), SCM Press, ISBN 0-334-02875-2, archived from the original on 26 November 2005.
- ——— (1965), Brown, D. Mackenzie (ed.), Ultimate Concern: Tillich in Dialogue, Harper & Row, archived from the original on 26 November 2005.
- ——— (1966). The Future of Religions. New York: Charles Scribner's.
  - ——— (1976) [1966], Brauer, Jerald C. (ed.), The Future of Religions (posthumous; includes autobiographical chapter), Harper & Row, ISBN 0060682477.
- ——— (1966). On the Boundary. New York: Charles Scribner's.
- ——— (1984) [1967], Anshen, Ruth Nanda (ed.), My Search for Absolutes (posthumous; includes autobiographical chapter), Simon & Schuster, ISBN 0-671-50585-8, archived from the original on 26 November 2005
- ——— (1969). Adams, James Luther (ed.). What Is Religion?. New York: Harper & Row.
- ——— (1970), Brauer, J.C (ed.), My Travel Diary 1936: Between Two Worlds, Harper & Row, archived from the original on 22 June 2006.
- ——— (1972), Braaten, Carl Edward (ed.), A History of Christian Thought: From its Judaic and Hellenistic Origins to Existentialism, Simon & Schuster, ISBN 978-0-67121426-5 (edited from his lectures and published posthumously).
  - A History of Christian Thought (1968), Harper & Row, contains the first part of the two part 1972 edition (comprising the 38 New York lectures).
- ——— (1981) [German, 1923], The System of the Sciences According to Objects and Methods, Paul Wiebe transl., London: Bucknell University Press, ISBN 978-0-83875013-1.
- ——— (1999), Church, F. Forrester (ed.), The Essential Tillich (anthology), U. of Chicago Press, ISBN 978-0-22680343-2
- ——— (1981), Lee, Paul (ed.), The Meaning of Health (Book), North Atlantic Books, ISBN 9780913028872, OCLC 1078847441

== See also ==
- Christian existentialism
- Existential Thomism
- List of American philosophers
- Neo-orthodoxy
- Panentheism
- Philosophical theology
- Postmodern Christianity
- Systematic theology
- Theistic personalism
