= Analogy of Religion =

1736 work by Joseph Butler

The Analogy of Religion, Natural and Revealed, to the Constitution and Course of Nature is an apologetic work of an English Anglican theologian and philosopher Joseph Butler (1736).

The book aims to show a real correspondence, or analogy, between the beliefs of Christianity on the one hand and the workings of nature and providence on the other, and that through this analogy both have one and the same origin. The work takes the existence of God for granted. Although the book does not mention Deists, some consider it to have contributed more to the decline of Deism than any other single work. The Analogy has been reprinted several times, also during the 20th century.

The work has had a deep influence for example to John Henry Newman, which can be seen in his Essay on Development and in the Grammar of Assent.

== See also ==
- Analogia entis
- The Mind of the Maker
