= Theology of culture =

Theology that studies culture and cultural phenomena

Theology of culture is a branch of theology that studies culture and cultural phenomena. It lies close to philosophy of culture, but it naturally works from a religious focus.

Paul Tillich (1886–1965) popularized the concept of a theology of culture, publishing a book with that title in 1959, that showed the religious dimension of several spheres of culture. He discussed ways of differentiating the sacred and the secular. In Tillich's work existentialism was also an important motif.
