= John McClintock (theologian) =

American theologian (1814–1870)

The Reverend John McClintock
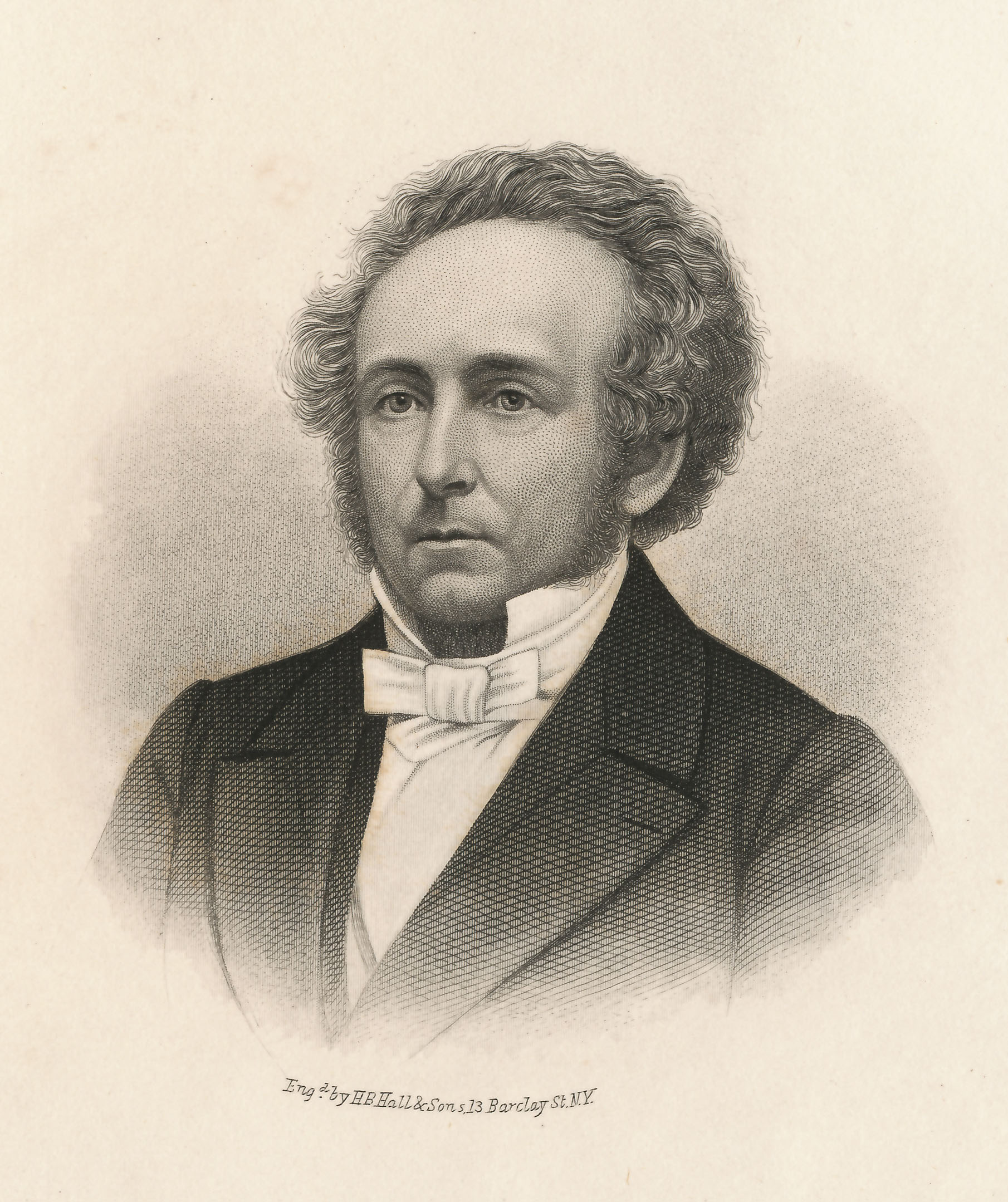
- Born: October 27, 1814; Philadelphia, Pennsylvania, U.S.
- Died: March 4, 1870 (aged 55); Madison, New Jersey, U.S.
- Education: A.B., 1835 – University of Pennsylvania; A.M. 1835, – University of Pennsylvania; D.D. 1848, –University of Pennsylvania; LL.D., 1866 – Rutgers University
- Spouses: Caroline Augusta Wakeman; Catharine W. Stevenson
- Children: 4
- Parent(s): John McClintock Sr. Martha McMackin

Ecclesiastical career
- Religion: Methodist
- Church: St. Paul's Methodist Episcopal Church, New York City; American Chapel in Paris
- Writings: A First Book in Latin (1846); A First Book in Greek (1848) Sketches of Eminent Methodist Ministers (1854); Cyclopædia of Biblical, Theological and Ecclesiastical Literature (1867–1881)
- Offices held: Professor of Mathematics at Dickinson College (1836–1840); Professor of Ancient Classics at Dickinson College (1840–1848); Editor of The Methodist Review (1848–1856); President and Professor of Practical Theology in Drew Theological Seminary (1867–1870)

John McClintock (October 27, 1814 – March 4, 1870) was an American Methodist Episcopal theologian and educationalist, born in Philadelphia.

== Early life and education ==
McClintock was born in Philadelphia, on October 27, 1814. He matriculated at Wesleyan University in Middletown, Connecticut. Ill health, however, forced him to leave Wesleyan in his freshman year. He returned to Philadelphia, where he graduated with an A M. from the University of Pennsylvania in 1835.

== Career ==
McClintock was an assistant professor of mathematics (1836–1837), professor of mathematics (1837–1840), and professor of Latin and Greek (1840–1848) at Dickinson College, Carlisle, Pennsylvania. He opposed the Mexican–American War, as well as slavery, but did not consider himself an abolitionist.

In 1847, McClintock was arrested on the charge of instigating a riot, which resulted in the rescue of several fugitive slaves; his trial, in which he was acquitted, attracted wide attention. The trial dealt with the issue of Personal liberty laws in the North and the fugitive slave crisis.

When Stephen Olin, president of Wesleyan died, the chair was offered to McClintock, but he preferred the call to the editorship of The Methodist Quarterly Review, later renamed The Methodist Review, a post he held for eight years, from 1848 to 1856. In 1855, he declined the presidency of Troy University.

From 1857 to 1860, McClintock was pastor of St. Paul's Methodist Episcopal Church in New York City. From 1860 to 1864, he was in charge of the American chapel in Paris. There and in London, he did much to turn public opinion in favor of the Northern States. In 1865 to 1866, he was chairman of the central committee for the celebration of the centenary of American Methodism. He retired from the regular ministry in 1865, but preached in New Brunswick, New Jersey, until the spring of 1867, and in that year, at the wish of its founder, Daniel Drew, became the first president of the newly established Drew Theological Seminary at Madison, New Jersey (later, Drew University), where he died. At Drew, McClintock also served as professor of practical theology from 1867 until his death in 1870.

A preacher, orator, teacher, and scholar, McClintock is credited with raising the intellectual tone of American Methodism, particularly of the American Methodist clergy.

== Works ==
He introduced to his denomination the scholarly methods of the new German theology of the day by his translation with Charles E. Blumenthal of Neander's Life of Christ (1847), and of Félix Bungener's History of the Council of Trent (1855), and also by his great project, McClintock and Strong's Cyclopædia of Biblical, Theological and Ecclesiastical Literature (10 vols., 1867–1881; Supplement, 2 vols., 1885–1887), in the editing of which he was associated with James Strong (1822–1894), professor of exegetical theology in the Drew Theological Seminary from 1868 to 1893, and the sole supervising editor of the last six volumes of the Cyclopaedia and of the supplement.

With George Richard Crooks (1822–1897), his colleague at Dickinson College and in 1880–1897 professor of historical theology at Drew Seminary, McClintock edited several elementary textbooks in Latin and Greek (of which some were republished in Spanish), based on the pedagogical principle of imitation and constant repetition. Among McClintock's other publications are:

- Sketches of Eminent Methodist Ministers (1863)
- an edition of Richard Watson's Theological Institutes (1851)
- The Life and Letters of Rev. Stephen Olin (1854).
