= Philosophy of culture =

Branch of philosophy that examines the essence and meaning of culture

Philosophy of culture is a branch of philosophy that examines the essence and meaning of culture.

It focuses on how human creativity, rationality, and collective experiences shape cultural identities. It traces the development of cultural thought from early modern discussions on national identity and Enlightenment ideals, through German and English Romanticism, to more scientific approaches.

== Early modern discourses ==
=== German Romanticism ===
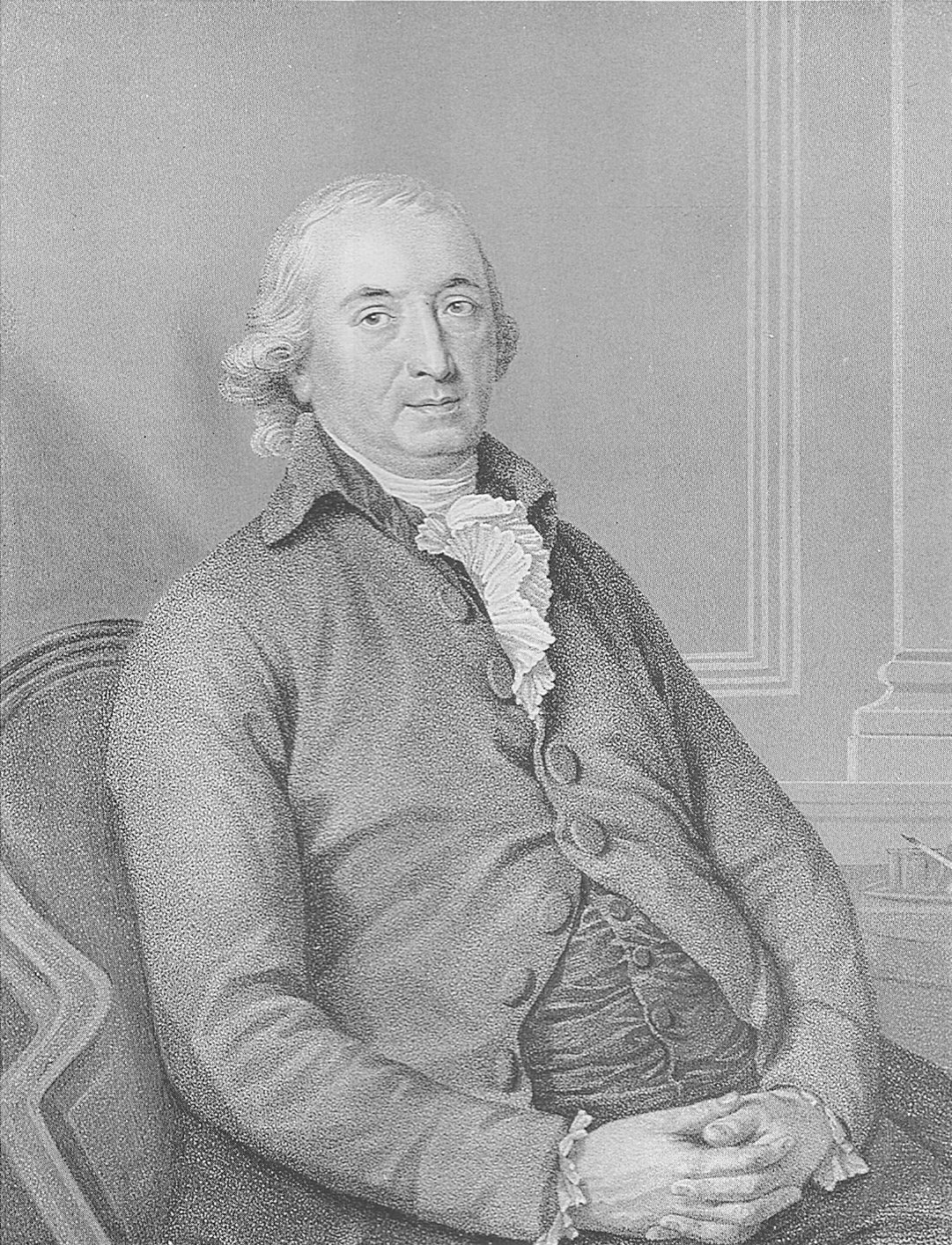
Johann Herder called attention to national cultures.

The German philosopher Immanuel Kant (1724–1804) has formulated an individualist definition of "enlightenment" similar to the concept of bildung: "Enlightenment is man's emergence from his self-incurred immaturity." He argued that this immaturity comes not from a lack of understanding, but from a lack of courage to think independently. Against this intellectual cowardice, Kant urged: Sapere aude, "Dare to be wise!" In reaction to Kant, German scholars such as Johann Gottfried Herder (1744–1803) argued that human creativity, which necessarily takes unpredictable and highly diverse forms, is as important as human rationality. Moreover, Herder proposed a collective form of bildung: "For Herder, Bildung was the totality of experiences that provide a coherent identity, and sense of common destiny, to a people."

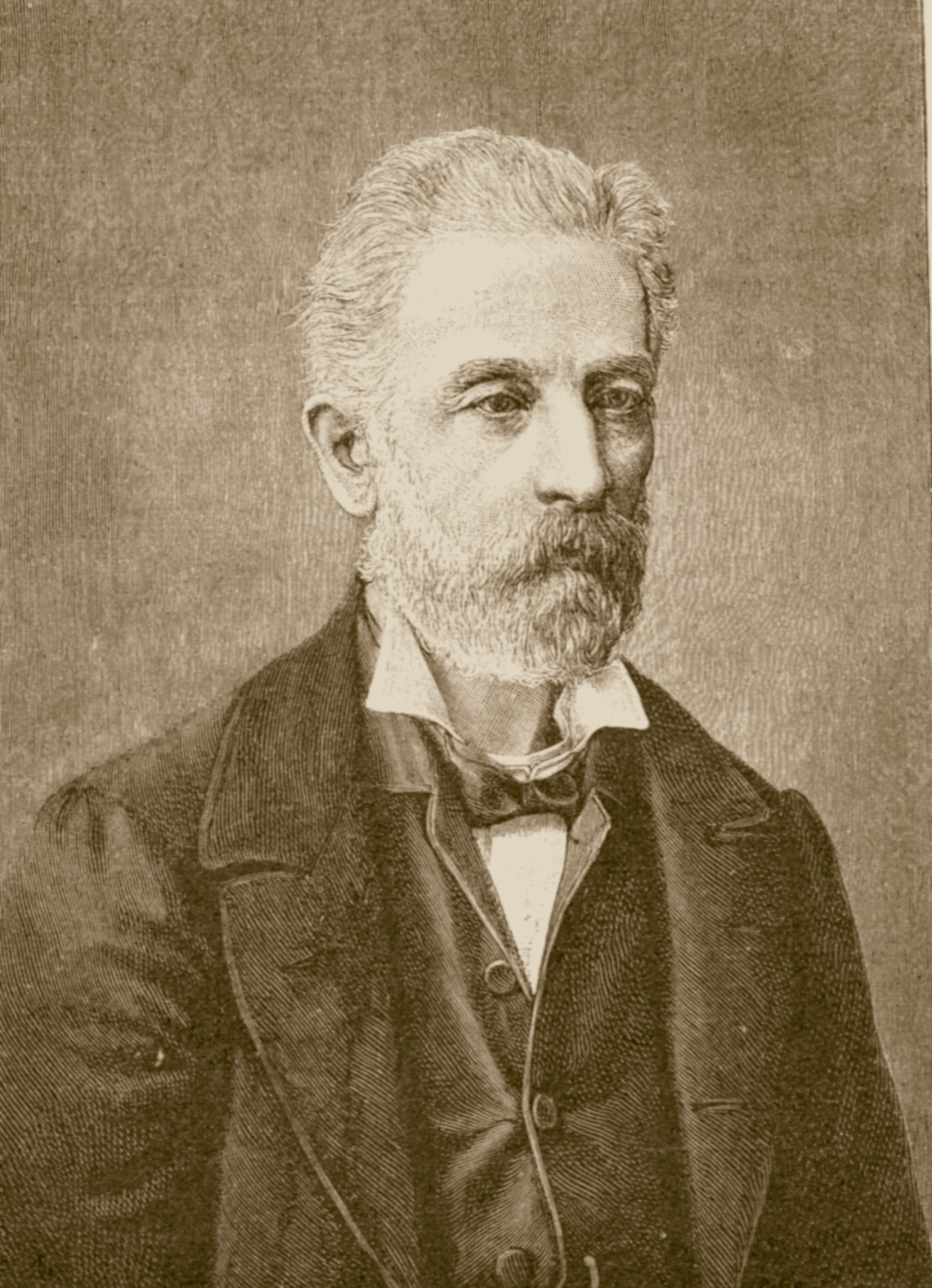
Adolf Bastian developed a universal model of culture.

In 1795, the linguist and philosopher Wilhelm von Humboldt (1767–1835) called for an anthropology that would synthesize Kant's and Herder's interests. During the Romantic era, scholars in Germany, especially those concerned with nationalist movements—such as the nationalist struggle to create a "Germany" out of diverse principalities, and the nationalist struggles by ethnic minorities against the Austro-Hungarian Empire—developed a more inclusive notion of culture as "worldview"(Weltanschauung). According to this school of thought, each ethnic group has a distinct worldview that is incommensurable with the worldviews of other groups. Although more inclusive than earlier views, this approach to culture still allowed for distinctions between "civilized" and "primitive" or "tribal" cultures.

In 1860, Adolf Bastian (1826–1905) argued for "the psychic unity of mankind". He proposed that a scientific comparison of all human societies would reveal that distinct worldviews consisted of the same basic elements. According to Bastian, all human societies share a set of "elementary ideas" (Elementargedanken); different cultures, or different "folk ideas" (Völkergedanken), are local modifications of the elementary ideas. This view paved the way for the modern understanding of culture. Franz Boas (1858–1942) was trained in this tradition, and he brought it with him when he left Germany for the United States.

=== English Romanticism ===
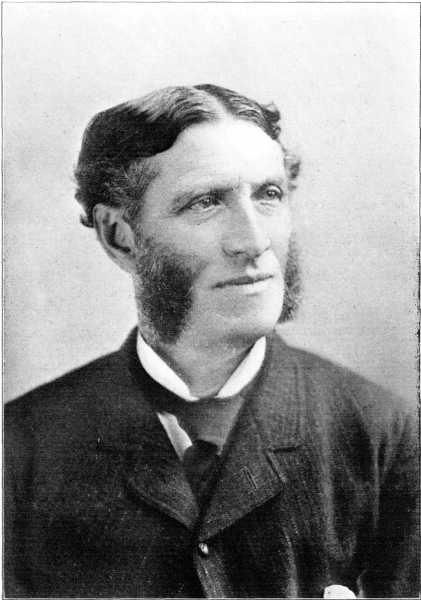
British poet and critic Matthew Arnold viewed "culture" as the cultivation of the humanist ideal.

In the 19th century, humanists such as English poet and essayist Matthew Arnold (1822–1888) used the word "culture" to refer to an ideal of individual human refinement, of "the best that has been thought and said in the world." This concept of culture is comparable to the German concept of bildung: "...culture being a pursuit of our total perfection by means of getting to know, on all the matters which most concern us, the best which has been thought and said in the world."

In practice, culture referred to an élite ideal and was associated with such activities as art, classical music, and haute cuisine. As these forms were associated with urban life, "culture" was identified with "civilization" (from lat. civitas, city). Another facet of the Romantic movement was an interest in folklore, which led to identifying a "culture" among non-elites. This distinction is often characterized as that between high culture, namely that of the ruling social group, and low culture. In other words, the idea of "culture" that developed in Europe during the 18th and early 19th centuries reflected inequalities within European societies.

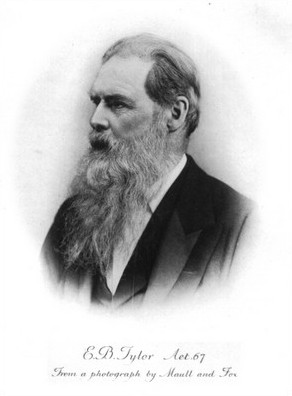
British anthropologist Edward Tylor was one of the first English-speaking scholars to use the term culture in an inclusive and universal sense.

Matthew Arnold contrasted "culture" with anarchy; other Europeans, following philosophers Thomas Hobbes and Jean-Jacques Rousseau, contrasted "culture" with "the state of nature". According to Hobbes and Rousseau, the Native Americans who were being conquered by Europeans from the 16th centuries on were living in a state of nature; this opposition was expressed through the contrast between "civilized" and "uncivilized". According to this way of thinking, one could classify some countries and nations as more civilized than others and some people as more cultured than others. This contrast led to Herbert Spencer's theory of Social Darwinism and Lewis Henry Morgan's theory of cultural evolution. Just as some critics have argued that the distinction between high and low cultures is really an expression of the conflict between European elites and non-elites, some critics have argued that the distinction between civilized and uncivilized people is really an expression of the conflict between European colonial powers and their colonial subjects.

Other 19th-century critics, following Rousseau have accepted this differentiation between higher and lower culture, but have seen the refinement and sophistication of high culture as corrupting and unnatural developments that obscure and distort people's essential nature. These critics considered folk music (as produced by "the folk", i.e., rural, illiterate, peasants) to honestly express a natural way of life, while classical music seemed superficial and decadent. Equally, this view often portrayed indigenous peoples as "noble savages" living authentic and unblemished lives, uncomplicated and uncorrupted by the highly stratified capitalist systems of the West.

In 1870 the anthropologist Edward Tylor (1832–1917) applied these ideas of higher versus lower culture to propose a theory of the evolution of religion. According to this theory, religion evolves from more polytheistic to more monotheistic forms. In the process, he redefined culture as a diverse set of activities characteristic of all human societies. This view paved the way for the modern understanding of culture.

== Later writers ==
Ludwig Wittgenstein's philosophical references to culture include his notes published as Culture and Value in 1977.

== See also ==
- Cultura
- Theology of culture

== Sources ==
- A Philosophy of Culture: The Scope of Holistic Pragmatism by Morton White
