= Alexander Jacob Schem =

German-American writer, editor and educator (1826–1881)

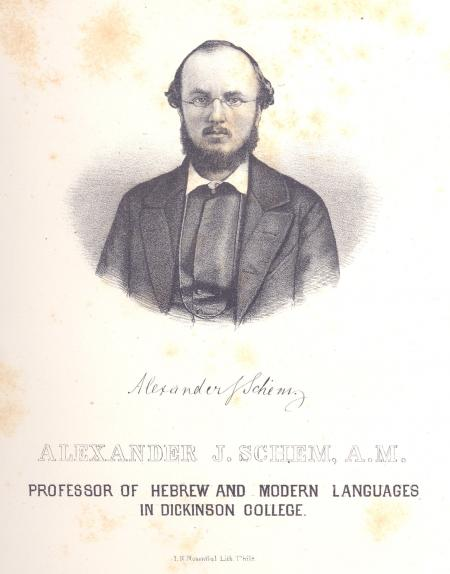
Alexander Schem

Alexander Jacob Schem (16 March 1826 – 21 May 1881) was a German-American writer, editor and educator.

== Early life ==
He attended the Paderborn gymnasium from 1839 to 1843, and then studied theology and philology at the Universities of Bonn and Tübingen. He was ordained a Roman Catholic priest in 1849 and served two years in Bielefeld. He became disillusioned with its dogma, and separated from the Church. In 1851 he emigrated to the United States.

== Immigrant ==
In the United States, he was a tutor for a time in the home of a publisher whose oldest daughter he married in 1853. That year, he began teaching in the Collegiate Institute at Mount Holly, New Jersey. In 1854, he became professor of ancient and modern languages in Dickinson College, but he resigned in 1860 to devote himself to literature and journalism.

He was a writer for the New York Tribune until 1869, when he undertook the editorship of the Deutsch-amerikanisches Conversations-Lexicon (11 vols., New York, 1869–1874). From 1874 to his death, he held the office of assistant superintendent of the public schools in New York City.

== Works ==
Besides the Deutsch-amerikanisches Conversations-Lexicon, he was a contributor to other cyclopædias of statistical, geographical, and religious articles. He was one of the editors of the Methodist and of the Methodist Quarterly Review. He prepared, with George Richard Crooks, a Latin-English Dictionary (Philadelphia, 1857), and published several editions of Schem's Statistics of the World; the American Ecclesiastical Year-Book (New York, 1860); the Ecclesiastical Almanac (1868 and 1869); and, with Henry Kiddle, a Cyclopædia of Education (1877), which was followed by two annual supplements called the Year-Book of Education (1878 and 1879).

He also wrote a book on the Russo-Turkish War (1877–1878), The War in the East (1878).

== Sources ==
- Biography at chronicles.dickinson.edu
