= Henry Kiddle =

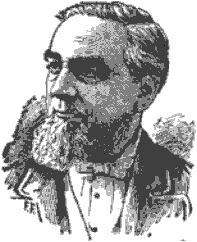
- Born: January 15, 1824; Bath, England
- Died: September 25, 1891 (aged 67); New York, New York
- Burial place: Cypress Hills Cemetery
- Occupation: Educator

Henry Kiddle (January 15, 1824 – September 25, 1891) was a United States educator who had an interest in spiritualism.

== Biography ==
A Short Course in Astronomy

Henry Kiddle was born in Bath, Somerset, England on January 15, 1824. He came as a boy to New York City where he studied under private tutors and at the normal school. In 1843, he was made principal of a ward school, but two years later resigned to take charge of one connected with the Leake and Watts Children's Home. He was principal of a grammar school 1846-1856. He was then appointed deputy superintendent of common schools in New York City. He was made superintendent in 1870, but resigned in 1879, owing to an adverse public sentiment created by his avowal of a belief in spiritualism.

Mr. Kiddle received the degree of A. M. from Union College in 1848, and that of "Officier d'Académie" from the University of France in 1878. He has published in pamphlet form various addresses on education, modern spiritualism, and religious topics. He edited several revisions of Goold Brown's English Grammar (last ed., New York, 1882) and other school textbooks, including a Text-Book of Physics (1883).

He died at his home in New York on September 25, 1891, and was buried at Cypress Hills Cemetery.

== Works ==
- New Elementary Astronomy (1868)
- A Short Course in Astronomy (1871)
- Cyclopædia of Education (1877) with Alexander J. Schem
- Year Books of Education, 1878-1879
- Spiritual Communications (1879)
- A Manual of Astronomy and the Use of the Globes (1882)
