= Erich Przywara =

German–Polish Jesuit philosopher (1889–1972)

The Reverend Erich Przywara SJ
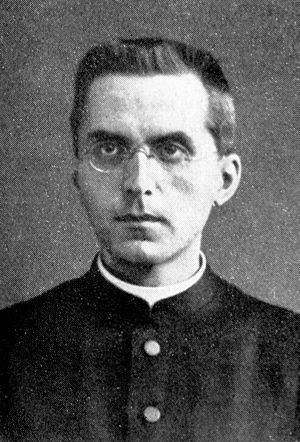
- Portrait of Przywara, c. 1920s
- Born: 12 December 1889; Kattowitz, Kingdom of Prussia, German Empire (now Katowice, Poland)
- Died: 28 September 1972 (aged 82); Hagen, Bavaria, West Germany

Education
- Education: Ignatius College

Philosophical work
- Era: 20th-century philosophy
- Region: Western philosophy
- School: Phenomenology; Thomism
- Main interests: Ontology; Epistemology
- Notable works: Analogia Entis (1932)
- Notable ideas: Analogy of being, unity-in-tension

Erich Przywara SJ (Polish: [pʂɨˈvara]; 12 October 1889 – 28 September 1972) was a German–Polish Jesuit Catholic priest, philosopher, and theologian, who was one of the first Catholics to engage in dialogue with modern philosophers, especially those of the phenomenological tradition. He is best known for synthesizing the thought of prominent thinkers around the notion of the analogy of being, the tension between divine immanence and divine transcendence, a "unity-in-tension".

== Life ==
Przywara was born on 12 December 1889 to a Polish father and a German mother in the upper Silesian (Prussian) town of Kattowitz, today Katowice in Poland. Due to anti-Jesuit laws still in effect in Germany, in 1908 he entered the novitiate of the Society of Jesus in Exaten, Netherlands, concluding his philosophical and theological studies at nearby Ignatius College in Valkenburg. From 1913 to 1917 Przywara taught at Stella Matutina, in Feldkirch, Austria, where he also served as the prefect of music. In 1920 he was ordained and in 1922 he moved to Munich, where from 1922 to 1941 he was part of the editorial team of the journal Stimmen der Zeit.

During this period, Przywara held hundreds of lectures all over central Europe, most famously at the Davos seminar in 1928 and 1929. He was also extremely prolific, authoring between 1922 and 1932 as many as 17 books and 230 articles and reviews (and eventually over 40 books and 800 articles and reviews). During this time he also engaged in ecumenical dialogue with the Protestant theologian Karl Barth, who considered Przywara to be his most serious opponent, indeed "the giant Goliath incarnate," inviting Przywara to his seminars in 1929 (in Münster) and 1931 (in Bonn).

While not a member of the Nazi Party, Przywara was supportive of the Reich from a perspective of Catholic integralism and religiously motivated antisemitism and joined the Reich Chamber of Literature in 1933. Przywara's criticisms of Nazi ideology were limited to criticisms of secularism, neopaganism, and anti-Catholicism in Nazi Germany. Przywara advocated for an "interpenetration" of the nation, state, and church, using the image of the Resurrection of Jesus as an image for nationalist Christianity and negatively identified "internationalism" with Judaism invoking the image of the Wandering Jew.

In 1938 Przywara published Deus Semper Maior, a massive three-volume commentary on the Spiritual Exercises of Ignatius of Loyola which is well known in the Jesuits.

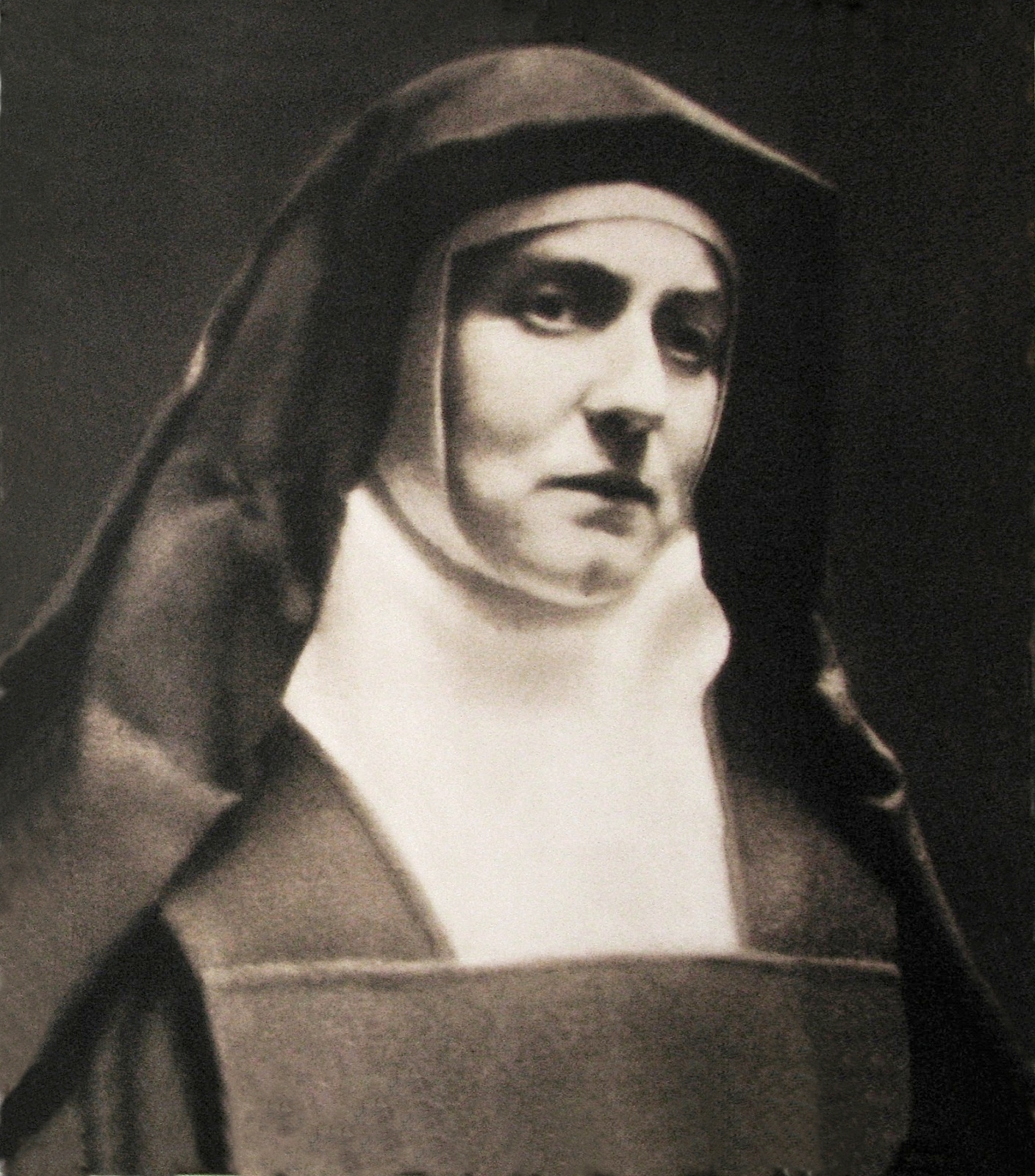
Przywara was a colleague and friend of the famous philosopher Edith Stein, who was murdered in the Birkenau gas chambers at the Auschwitz concentration camp.

In 1942, his friend and philosophical colleague Edith Stein was killed in Auschwitz. In 1945, his fellow Jesuit and colleague at Stimmen der Zeit Alfred Delp was executed for treason, as was his friend Karl Barth's student Dietrich Bonhoeffer. In the words of Thomas O’Meara, "The priest who had appeared to possess energy without limits became anxious, incapable of work, and erratic, a condition only heightened by the opinions of others that it was partly psycho-somatic, exaggerated, or easily remedied."

Though ousted from his familiar position and unable to write and publish, he continued to be active, as he was commissioned by Cardinal Faulhaber with the pastoral care of elderly academics in Munich. He also gave regular lectures in the old Bürgersaalkirche and conducted small seminars in private residences on such topics as Hölderlin, Nietzsche, and Rilke. His health, though, continued to decline, leading to multiple interventions by his erstwhile student and lifelong friend Hans Urs von Balthasar, who in 1947 brought him to Switzerland for the purposes of convalescence. Balthasar's long-term plans to work with and care for his teacher in Switzerland ultimately failed, however. Przywara returned to Munich and in 1950 retired from community religious life to live in the country in a little village called Hagen, near Murnau. Between 1949 and 1955 he briefly returned to the public spotlight, giving a series of radio talks for the Südwestrundfunk Rundfunk, some of which were later published. During this time he also published some of his wartime manuscripts and lectures, and in the last years of his life he authored a number of new works. He died in 1972 and was interred at the Jesuit cemetery in Pullach.

== Early theological inspiration ==
While the concept of the analogy of being is not original to Przywara (having originated in the schools of the Catholic orders), with Przywara the concept undergoes a dramatic enrichment that is fed, on the one hand, by his love of "music as form" and by his early readings of Augustine, Dionysius the Areopagite, Thomas Aquinas, and John Henry Newman.

From his early musical training he came to appreciate the contrapuntal theme of a unity and rhythmic interplay of opposites. On the basis of his reading of Augustine, who speaks of God as both interior and superior to the soul, Przywara presented the Catholic concept of God in terms a mysterious simultaneity and interplay of divine immanence and transcendence. From Dionysius he came to emphasize God's "dazzling darkness", thereby giving his doctrine of analogy a final, apophatic stress. From Aquinas, beginning with his study of Thomas's De ente et essentia, he appropriated the fundamental ontological distinction between essence and existence and the equally important distinction between primary and secondary causality (secondary causation). Finally, from Newman he appropriated the idea of "opposite virtues", as seen, for example, in the complementarity of "loving fear" and a "fearing love," to which one must add his reading of Goethe, the Romantic philosophy of Franz von Baader, the Jewish sociologist Georg Simmel, and the Protestant theologian Ernst Troeltsch. All of these influences helped him to formulate his doctrine of analogy in more dynamic terms as a "dynamic polarity" – a polarity that registers both the creaturely tension between essence and existence as well as the tension between divine immanence and divine transcendence. Thus for Przywara the term "analogy" came to be more or less synonymous with what he also calls "unity-in-tension".

== Various engagements ==
As a synthesizer of Catholic tradition, Przywara was one of the first Catholic theologians to engage creatively and critically with the modern world, defending Catholicism on two main fronts: one philosophical, the other theological (and ecumenical). On the philosophical front, he was one of the first Catholic thinkers to engage modern phenomenology, in particular the philosophies of Edmund Husserl, Max Scheler, and Martin Heidegger. On the theological front, he was one of the first Catholic theologians to engage in dialogue with Karl Barth, opposing Barth's early theology with the analogy of being as the Catholic answer to Protestant dialectics. He was, moreover, one of the first Catholic theologians to engage in dialogue with Jewish rabbis in Essen and Frankfurt, corresponding both before and after the war with the chief Berlin rabbi, Leo Baeck.

== Doctrine of analogy ==
Przywara's understanding of the analogy of being is set forth principally in his 1932 work, Analogia Entis. For Przywara, following the teaching of Thomas Aquinas, the distinction between essence and existence runs through the whole of created reality, indeed, it defines created reality in its difference from God, the creator, whose essence is to be; and therein, for Przywara, lies the ground of the analogy of being.

Its theological expression, however, he found best summarized in the teaching of the Fourth Lateran Council of 1215, according to which "between Creator and creature no similitude can be expressed without implying an even greater dissimilitude". It was in this sense, Przywara maintained, that the analogia entis remains a formal principle and rhythm ("in and beyond") of Catholic theology.

== Late works ==
Przywara's later work was both a refinement and radicalization of themes within his earlier theology. In Humanitas (1952), for instance, Przywara continued his analysis of modern theology and philosophy, in this case focusing on anthropology in particular. Just like his earlier Himmelreich (1922/23), Przywara also continued writing exegetical works. He planned to write commentaries on the Gospels, but in the end, published only a commentary on the Gospel of John (Christentum gemäß Johannes; 1954) while his writings on Matthew remain unpublished. Equally, Alter und Neuer Bund (1956), whose initial form was a series of talks given in Berlin, Vienna, and Munich during World War II, explores the relationship between the Old and New Testament. Przywara offers a theological diagnosis of the times through his Mariological, ecclesiological, and Christological readings of the Old Testament. In this work Przywara calls the cross of Christ the ‘energetic’ which powers the transition between the old and the new covenant.

The late Przywara, particularly in his Logos, Abendland, Reich, Commercium (1964), also developed a theology of the commercium, or "wondrous exchange." The idea of the commercium comes from the O admirabile commercium sung at the Vigil of Epiphany. The commercium stands as a summary of all the "exchanges" within the New Testament: that in Jesus Christ the free, righteous, and blessed God becomes a servant, sin, and suffers death so that an enslaved, sinful, and suffering humanity might be freed, made righteous, and inherit eternal life. Equally important, however, is the connubium, or the nuptial union between Christ and believers.

== Influence and reception ==
Przywara was an important influence upon Karl Rahner, who gave the laudatio for Przywara in 1967, and especially upon Hans Urs von Balthasar, who regarded him as an "unforgettable guide and master." Indeed, he considered the "breadth and profundity of his thought" to be "without comparison in our time." He was at the same time an esteemed teacher of the Catholic philosopher Josef Pieper and a friend and mentor to the now canonized philosopher Edith Stein. While Przywara's reception in modern Catholic theology was generally positive, and his importance to Hans Urs von Balthasar enduring, his doctrine of the analogy of being was fiercely challenged by Karl Barth, who saw in it a kind of natural theology and therefore rejected it, calling it the "invention of Antichrist" and the "chief reason for not becoming Catholic." This issue continues to define the ecumenical debate between Reformed and Catholic Christians.

Pope Francis quoted his book Idee Europa during his acceptance speech for the Charlemagne Prize. Pope John Paul II commended Przywara as one of the great theologians of the Catholic tradition, in such company as Albert the Great.

== Selected works ==
- Eucharistie und Arbeit (1917)
- Einführung in Newmans Wesen und Werk (1922)
- Religionsbegründung. Max Scheler—J.H. Newman (1923)
- Gottgeheimnis der Welt (1923)
- Gott (1926)
- Religionsphilosophie katholischer Theologie (1926; translated into English as Polarity, 1935)
- Ringen der Gegenwart, 2 vols. (1929)
- Das Geheimnis Kierkegaards (1929)
- Analogia entis: Metaphysik (1932)
- Augustinus. Die Gestalt als Gefüge (1934)
- Deus semper maior. Theologie der Exerzitien, 3 vols. (1938)
- Crucis mysterium. Das christliche Heute (1939)
- Humanitas. Der Mensch gestern und morgen (1952)
- Christentum gemäß Johannes (1954)
- In und Gegen. Stellungnahmen zur Zeit (1955)
- Alter und Neuer Bund. Theologie der Stunde (1956)
- Ignatianisch (1956)
- Idee Europa (1956)
- Mensch: Typologische Anthropologie (1959)
- Logos, Abendland, Reich, Commercium (1964)
- Katholische Krise (1967)

== Sources ==
- Hans Urs von Balthasar, “Analogie und Dialektik. Zur Klärung der Prinzipienlehre Karl Barths.” In Divus Thomas 22 (1944), 171-216.
- Hans Urs von Balthasar, “Analogie und Natur. Zur Klärung der theologischen Prinzipienlehre Karl Barths.” In Divus Thomas 23 (1945), 3-56.
- Hans Urs von Balthasar, “Die Metaphysik Erich Przywaras.” In Schweizerische Rundschau 33 (1933/34), 489-499.
- Hans Urs von Balthasar, “Erich Przywara.” In Erich Przywara. Sein Schrifttum 1912-1962, ed. Leo Zimny. Einsiedeln: Johannes Verlag, 1963, 5-18.
- Siegfried Behn, ed, Der beständige Aufbruch. Festschrift für Erich Przywara. Nürnberg: Glock und Lutz, 1959.
- John Betz, "Translator's Introduction," in Erich Przywara, Analogia Entis: Metaphysics: Original Structure and Universal Rhythm, Eerdmans, Grand Rapids, 2014, pp. 1–116.
- Julio César Terán Dutari, Christentum und Metaphysik: Das Verhaltnis beider nach der Analogielehre Erich Przywaras (1889–1972) (Munich: Berchmanskolleg Verlag, 1973).
- Julio César Terán Dutari, "Erich Przywaras Deutung des religionphilosophischen Anliegens Newmans," Newman Studien VII (Nurnberg: Glock und Lutz, 1952).
- Eva-Maria Faber., “Deus semper maior. Erich Przywaras Theologie der Exerzitien.” In Geist und Leben 66 (1993), 208-227.
- Eva-Maria Faber, Kirche zwischen Identität und Differenz. Die ekklesiologischen Entwürfe von Romano Guardini und Erich Przywara." Würzburg: Echter, 1993.
- Eva-Maria Faber, "Künder der lebendigen Nähe des unbegreiflichen Gottes. Hans Urs von Balthasar und sein ‘Mentor’ Erich Przywara.” In Die Kunst Gottes verstehen. Hans Urs von Balthasars theologische Provokationen. Freiburg: Herder, 2005, 384-409.
- Eva-Maria Faber, “Skandal und Torheit. Die katholische Kreuzestheologie Erich Przywaras.” In Geist und Leben 69 (1996), 338-353.
- Bernhard Gertz, Glaubenswelt als Analogie. Die theologische Analogielehre Erich Przywaras und ihr Ort in der Auseinandersetzung um die analogia fidei. Düsseldorf: Patmos, 1969.
- Bernhard Gertz, “Kreuz-Struktur: Zur theologischen Methode Erich Przywaras.” In Theologie und Philosophie 45 (1970), 555-561.
- Philip John Paul Gonzales, Reimagining the Analogia Entis: The Future of Erich Przywara's Christian Vision (Grand Rapids, Mich.: W.B. Eerdmans Publishing Company, 2019). Foreword by Cyril O’Regan.
- Eberhard Mechels, Analogie bei Erich Przywara und Karl Barth. Das Verhältnis von Offenbarungstheologie und Metaphysik. Neukirchen-Vluyn: Neukirchener Verlag, 1974.
- Erich Naab, Zur Begründung der analogia entis bei Erich Przywara. Eine Eröterung. Regensburg: Pustet, 1987.
- Stephen Nieborak, “Homo analogia.” Zur philosophisch-theologischen Bedeutung der “analogia entis” im Rahmen der existentiellen Frage bei Erich Przywara S. J. (1889-1972). Frankfurt: Peter Lang, 1994.
- Kenneth Oakes, "The Cross and the analogia entis in Erich Przywara," in Thomas Joseph White (ed)., The Analogy of Being: Wisdom of God or Invention of the Antichrist?, (Grand Rapids: Eerdmans, 2011), pp. 147–71.
- Kenneth Oakes, "Three Themes in Przywara's Early Theology", The Thomist 74:2 (2010), pp. 283–310.
- Thomas F. O’Meara, O.P. "Paul Tillich and Erich Przywara at Davos," in Gregorianum 87 (2006), pp. 227–238.
- Thomas F., O'Meara, O.P. Erich Przywara, S.J. His Theology and His World. Notre Dame, IN: University of Notre Dame Press, 2002.
- Paul Silas Peterson, "Erich Przywara on Sieg-Katholizismus, bolshevism, the Jews, Volk, Reich and the analogia entis in the 1920s and 1930s," in Journal for the History of Modern Theology 19 (2012), pp. 104–140.
- Aaron Pidel, "Erich Przywara and 'Catholic Fascism': A Reply to Paul Paul Silas Peterson." Journal for the History of Modern Theology 23 (2016): 27-55.
- Rahner, Karl, Gnade als Freiheit. Freiburg: Herder, 1968, 266-273.
- Thomas Schumacher, “In-Über”: Analogie als Grundbestimmung von Theologie, im Ausgang von Erich Przywara. München: Inst. z.F.d. Glaubenslehre, 1993.
- Karl Gerhard Steck, “Über das ekklesiologische Gespräch zwischen Karl Barth und Erich Przywara 1927/29.” In Antwort. Karl Barth zum 70. Geburtstag. Zurich: Evangelischer Verlag, 1956, 249-265.
- Gustav Wilhelmy, “Vita Erich Przywara.” In Erich Przywara 1889-1869. Eine Festgabe, ed. Wilhelmy. Düsseldorf: Patmos, 1969.
- Friedrich Wulf, “Christliches Denken. Eine Einführung in das theologisch-religiöse Werk von Erich Przywara SJ (1889-1972).” In Gottes Nähe. Religiöse Erfahrung in Mystik und Offenbarung. Festschrift für Josef Sudbrack SJ zum 65. Geburtstag. Würzburg: Echter, 1990, 353-366.
- Martha Zechmeister, Gottes-Nacht. Erich Przywaras Weg negativer Theologie. Münster: LIT, 1997.
- James V. Zeitz, Spirituality and Analogia Entis According to Erich Pryzwara, S.J.: Metaphysics and Religious Experience, the Ignatian Exercises, the Balance in Rhythm in 'Similarity' and 'Greater Dissimilarity' According to Lateran IV (Washington D. C.: The University Press of America, 1982).
- Leo Zimny, Erich Przywara. Sein Schrifttum (1912-1962). Einsiedeln: Johannes Verlag, 1963
