= Abel Stevens =

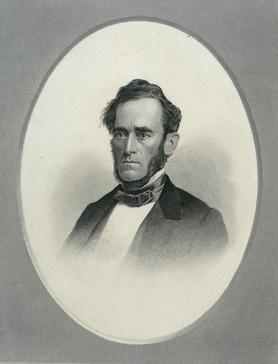
- Engraving of Abel Stevens by Fitz Edwin Jones.
- Born: 1815
- Died: 1897 (aged 81–82)
- Occupations: Methodist minister, editor, and author
- Known for: Books of Methodist religious history

Abel Stevens (1815–1897) was an American clergyman, editor, and author known for his books on Methodist religious history. He wrote History of the Methodist Episcopal Church in the United States of America, an early history of the church that is frequently referenced in historical works, and A Compendious History of American Methodism.

== Selected publications ==
- Memorials of the introduction of Methodism into the eastern states: comprising biographical notices of its early preachers, sketches of its first churches, and reminiscences of its early struggles and successes. Boston, C. H. Pierce [etc.]; New York, Lane & Tippett; [etc., etc.] 1848
- Sketches & incidents. New York, Lane & Scott, 1848 (edited by George Peck; also attributed to Abel Stevens)
- Remarkable examples of moral recovery showing the power of religion in extreme cases ... New York, Carlton & Phillips, 1854
- History of the religious movement of the eighteenth century, called Methodism, considered in its different denominational forms, and its relations to British and American Protestantism. New York, Carlton & Porter; London, A. Heylin [1858-61]
- Life and times of Nathan Bangs, D. D. New York, Carlton & Porter 1863
- Women of Methodism; its three foundresses, Susanna Wesley, the Countess of Huntingdon, and Barbara Heck; with sketches of their female associates and successors in the early history of the denomination. New York, Carlton & Porter, 1866
- Madame de Staël, a study of her life and times : the first revolution and the first empire. New York : Harper & Brothers, 1880
