= George Richard Crooks =

American Methodist minister and writer (1822–1897)

George R. Crooks
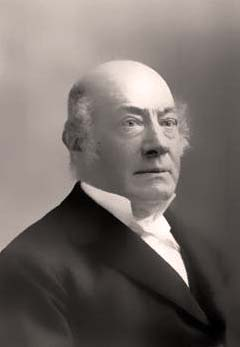
- Born: February 3, 1822; Philadelphia, Pennsylvania, U.S.
- Died: February 20, 1897 (aged 75); Madison, New Jersey, U.S.
- Education: A. B. 1840 Dickinson College; A. M. 1843 Dickinson College; D. D. 1857 Dickinson College; L.L.D. 1873 Dickinson College
- Spouse: Susan Frances Emory
- Children: 5
- Parent(s): George Richard Crooks, Sr.
- Religion: Methodist
- Church: Philadelphia Conference (1848–1857), New York East Conference (1857–1876)
- Writings: A First Book in Latin (1846); The Life and Letters of Rev. Dr. John McClintock (1876); The Life of Bishop Matthew Simpson of the Methodist Episcopal Church (1890); The Story of the Christian Church (1897) (with John F. Hurst) Library of Biblical and Theological Literature (2 vols) (1897, 1900)
- Congregations served: k.
- Offices held: Editor of The Methodist (1860–1875)

George Richard Crooks (February 3, 1822 Philadelphia – February 20, 1897) was an American Methodist minister, writer, and educator.

== Early career ==
Crooks was born in Philadelphia, the son of George R. Crooks Sr. and Mary M. Crooks. He graduated from Dickinson College in 1840 at the age of 18, and, according to his yearbooks, his family was then residing in Adams, Illinois. Following graduation he undertook missionary work as a circuit rider in Illinois. He soon returned to Dickinson, and in the 1841-2 Catalogue of the Officers and Students of Dickinson College, Crooks is listed as "Tutor in Languages and Mathematics."

George Crooks received his A. M. degree from Dickinson College in 1843. He then accepted a position as principal of the Dickinson-College Grammar school, and in his third year was listed as "Rev. George R. Crooks, A.M." In 1846 he was promoted to adjunct professor of Latin and Greek.

== Family life ==
Rev. George Crooks married Susan Frances Emory ("Fanny") of Baltimore on July 10, 1846. She was a daughter of Bishop John Emory, and sister to Robert Emory, who was president of Dickinson College. George and Susan Crooks had at least seven children. Their firstborn was George William Crooks, born in 1847, who died in 1853. After the death from tuberculosis of Robert Emory at age 33, their next child was named Robert Emory Crooks. He died as a young child in 1857. Mary Crooks, the oldest daughter, was born in Pennsylvania in 1851, married an Englishman, William Perry, and resided at Chislehurst, Kent. Fanny Elizabeth Crooks, also married an Englishman, Harry Withers Chubb. Daughters Katherine ("Kate") Morgan and Nellie Crooks lived at home for many years and were unmarried. Kate became an English professor at Milwaukee–Downer College after her father's death.

== The Methodist Conference ==
After completing his master's degree at Dickinson, Rev. George Crooks joined the Philadelphia Conference of the Methodist Episcopal Church in 1843. He held thirteen positions as minister in Pennsylvania, Delaware, and New York, and spent five years in the role of supernumerary minister (1870–1875). His Church positions are shown below.

=== Churches in Pennsylvania and Delaware ===
| Date | Church | Date | Church |
|---|---|---|---|
| 1848 | Pottstown | 1851 | Trinity, Philadelphia |
| 1853 | St. John's, Philadelphia | 1855 | St. Paul's, Wilmington |

=== Churches in New York ===
| Date | Church | Date | Church |
|---|---|---|---|
| 1857 | Seventeenth Street, New York | 1859 | Washington Ave., Brooklyn |
| 1861 | Sands Street, Brooklyn | 1863 | Seventeenth Street, New York |
| 1866 | Flushing, Long Island | 1869 | Mamaroneck |
| 1876 | North Tarrytown | 1879 | St. Paul's, Peekskill |

== Publications ==
In 1860, Crooks became editor of The Methodist, a publication described by a colleague as "the doughty unofficial rival of the official weekly – The Christian Advocate." In conjunction with John McClintock, he prepared a series of "First Books" in Latin and Greek (1846–1847). In 1852 Crooks edited a republication of Butler's Analogy, for which he added an analysis, index, and biography. He wrote Life and Letters of Rev. Dr. John McClintock (1876), and Sermons of Bishop Simpson (1885).

=== Works co-authored or co-edited by Crooks ===
| Title | Co-Author | Year | Publisher |
|---|---|---|---|
| A First Book in Latin | McClintock | 1846 | Harper & Bros. |
| A First Book in Greek | McClintock | 1847 | Harper & Bros. |
| A New Latin-English School Lexicon | Schem | 1858 | Lippincott |
| Theological Encyclopedia and Methodology | Hurst | 1884–1894 | Hunt & Eaton |

=== Books written or edited by Crooks ===
| Title | Date | Publisher |
|---|---|---|
| Bishop Butler's Analogy of Religion, Natural and Revealed, to the Constitution and Course of Nature | 1852 | Harper & Bros. |
| Life and letters of the Rev. John M'Clintock | 1876 | Nelson & Phillips |
| Sermons by Bishop Matthew Simpson of the Methodist Episcopal Church. | 1885 | Harper & Bros. |
| Why Am I a Methodist. | 1886 | Eaton & Mains |
| The Life of Bishop Matthew Simpson of the Methodist Episcopal Church. | 1890 | Harper & Bros. |
| The Story of the Christian Church | 1897 | Eaton & Mains |

== Contributions to church and theology ==
In 1841 entered the ministry of the Methodist Episcopal Church, and became a missionary in Illinois. In 1848, having returned to the ministry, he was stationed successively at Philadelphia, Wilmington, New York City, and Brooklyn. Rev. George Crooks was appointed Professor of Historical Theology at Drew Theological Seminary from 1880 until his death. According to a commemorative volume, he was seen as one of five professors "whose teaching and leadership shaped the early Drew Theological Seminary."

Upon the death of Rev. Crooks, the Bible Society eulogized,

His rare linguistic attainments, his extensive knowledge of men, his profound interest in all wise efforts for the evangelization of the world, his reverent trust in the oracles of God and his uniform Christian courtesy combined to make him an influential and agreeable member of this Committee.
