= The Mind of the Maker =

1941 theological book by Dorothy Sayers

First edition (publ. Methuen) Cover art by C W B

The Mind of the Maker (1941) is a Christian theological book written by Dorothy L. Sayers. It uses the experiences Sayers had of literary creativity to illuminate Christian doctrine about the nature of the Trinity.

The work has a Latin dedication to Saint Athanasius and to British Christian leaders.

== Literary significance and criticism ==
Regarded in the Christian world as something of a classic, it is often quoted.

In The Mind of the Maker, one of her most profound works, Sayers contends that the creative process in art works in ways that correspond to the dynamic relation among the three Persons of the Trinity in Christian theology—and that the activity of one illuminates the activity of the other.

Sayers' work finds readers beyond the religious world, as evidenced by reference to it in the software management book The Mythical Man-Month.

Dorothy Sayers, in her excellent book, The Mind of the Maker, divides creative activity into three stages: the idea, the implementation, and the interaction. A book, then, or a computer, or a program comes into existence first as an ideal construct, built outside time and space, but complete in the mind of the author. It is realized in time and space, by pen, ink, and paper, or by wire, silicon, and ferrite. The creation is complete when someone reads the book, uses the computer, or runs the program, thereby interacting with the mind of the maker. This description, which... Sayers uses to illuminate not only human creative activity but also the Christian doctrine of the Trinity, will help us in our present task.
