= Ehrenberg (surname) =

Ehrenberg is a German surname. Notable people with the surname include:

- Alain Ehrenberg (born 1950), French sociologist
- André Ehrenberg (born 1972), German slalom canoeist
- Andrew S. C. Ehrenberg (1926–2010), an English statistician and marketing scientist
- Carl Ehrenberg (1878–1962), German composer
- Christian Gottfried Ehrenberg (1795–1876), German naturalist, zoologist, comparative anatomist, geologist, and microscopist
- Eleonora Ehrenbergů (sometimes spelled Ehrenbergová or Ehrenberg; 1832–1912), Czech operatic soprano
- Felipe Ehrenberg (1943–2017), Mexican artist
- Gisela Bleibtreu-Ehrenberg (1929–2025), German sociologist, ethnologist, sexologist, and writer
- Gottfried Rudolf Otto Ehrenberg, birth name of Geoffrey Elton (1921–1994), German-born British political and constitutional historian
- Hans Ehrenberg (1883–1958), German Jewish Christian theologian, brother of historian Victor Ehrenberg
- Herman Ehrenberg (1816–1866), surveyor and Texian soldier who fought against Mexico in the Texas Revolution
- Herbert Ehrenberg (1926–2018), German politician, former Federal Minister of Labour and Social Affairs
- Israel Ehrenberg, birth name of Ashley Montagu (1905–1999), English anthropologist and humanist
- Julia Ehrenberg, birth name of Giulia Warwick (1857–1904), English opera and concert singer and professor of music
- Ludwig Ehrenberg, birth name of Lewis Elton (1923–2018), German-born British physicist and specialist in higher education
- Paul Ehrenberg (1876–1949), German violinist and painter
- Philipp Adolf von Ehrenberg (1583–1631), Prince-Bishop of Würzburg
- Richard Ehrenberg (1857–1921), German economist
- Ronald G. Ehrenberg (born 1946), American professor of labor economics
- Rudolf Ehrenberg, birth name of Ralph Elliott (1921–2012), professor of English
- Victor Ehrenberg (historian) (1891–1976), German historian, the father of Geoffrey and Lewis Elton
- Victor Ehrenberg (jurist) (1851–1929), German jurist
- Wilhelm Schubert van Ehrenberg (1637–1676), Flemish painter

== See also ==
- Ilya Ehrenburg (1891–1967), Soviet poet, translator, and writer
