= Claus-Wilhelm Canaris =

German jurist and jurisprudent (1937–2021)

- Born: 1 July 1937; Liegnitz, Germany
- Died: 5 March 2021 (aged 83); Munich, Germany
- Citizenship: German
- Education: LMU Munich
- Known for: Theory of legitimate expectations, theory of lacunas in law
- Awards: Gottfried Wilhelm Leibniz Prize
- Scientific career
- Fields: Private law, Commercial Law
- Workplaces: LMU Munich
- Doctoral advisor: Karl Larenz
- Doctoral students: Jens Petersen

Claus-Wilhelm Canaris (1 July 1937 – 5 March 2021) was a German jurist. Until his retirement in 2005 he was professor of Private Law, Commercial law and Labour law at LMU Munich.

== Life ==
Canaris was born in Liegnitz, Germany. His father was Constantin Canaris. Canaris went to school in Königsberg, Miesbach and Düsseldorf. He studied law, philosophy and Germanistics at the University of Paris, the University of Geneva, and LMU Munich, where he passed the first state exam (erstes Staatsexamen) in 1961. He became scientific assistant (wissenschaftlicher Assistent) of Karl Larenz at LMU Munich and graduated with the dissertation Die Feststellung von Lücken im Gesetz (How to find lacunas in the law) in 1964 (2nd edition 1983). He habilitated at LMU Munich in 1967 (Die Rechtsscheinhaftung im deutschen Privatrecht). His habilitation thesis was a groundbreaking study on the theory of legitimate expectations equal in rank to Rudolf von Jherings operationalization of culpa in contrahendo.

He was appointed full professor at the University of Graz in 1968, at the University of Hamburg in 1969, and finally returned to LMU Munich in 1972 taking the chair of his academic teacher Karl Larenz. In 2000, the German Minister of Justice, Herta Däubler-Gmelin, made him a member of the committee for the reform of the German law of obligations (Schuldrechtsreform). He was professor emeritus from 2004 until his death.

Canaris died on 5 March 2021, at the age of 83.

== Memberships and honours ==
- 1989: Gottfried Wilhelm Leibniz Prize of the Deutsche Forschungsgemeinschaft
- 1990: Member of the philosophical-historical class of the Bavarian Academy of Sciences
- 1990: Doctor honoris causa of the University of Lisbon
- 1991: Member of the European Academy of Sciences and Arts, Salzburg
- 1993: Doctor honoris causa of the Autonomous University of Madrid
- 1993: Doctor honoris causa of the University of Graz
- 1994: Member of the Academia dei Giusprivatisti Europei, Pavia
- 1994: Doctor honoris causa of the National and Kapodistrian University of Athens
- 1995: Member of the Austrian Academy of Sciences, Vienna (philosophical-historical class)
- 1997: Honorary Fellow of the Japan Society for the Promotion of Science
- 1998: Research fellowship of the Society for Advanced Legal Studies, London
- 1999 to 2006: Secretary of the philosophical-historical class of the Bavarian Academy of Sciences and Vice-President in 1999, 2001, 2003 and 2005
- 2000: Officer's Cross of the Order of Merit of the Federal Republic of Germany
- 2003: Member of the Istituto Veneto di Scienze, Lettere ed Arti, Venezia
- 2005: Doctor honoris causa of the University of Verona
- 2006: Bavarian Maximilian Order for Science and Art
- 2008: Member of the Istituto Lombardo Accademia di Scienze e Lettere, Milano
- 2009: Member of the Center for Advanced Studies at LMU Munich
- 2012: Doctor honoris causa of the Pontifícal Catholic University of Rio Grande do Sul (PUCRS).

== Works ==
- Die Feststellung von Lücken im Gesetz, Berlin 1964, 2nd edition 1983
- Systemdenken und Systembegriff in der Jurisprudenz, entwickelt am Beispiel des deutschen Privatrechts, Berlin 1969, 2nd edition 1983
  - Spanish: El sistema en la jurisprudencia (1998)
  - Italian: Pensiero sistematico e concetto di sistema nella giurisprudenza sviluppati sul modello del diritto privato tedesco (2009)
  - Portuguese: Pensamento sistemático e conceito de sistema na ciência do direito (2008)
- Die Vertrauenshaftung im deutschen Privatrecht, München 1971
- Bankvertragsrecht, Berlin und New York, 1975, 2nd edition 1981, 3rd edition 1988 volume 1
- Schweigen im Rechtsverkehr als Verpflichtungsgrund. in: Festschrift für Willburg zu 70. Geburtstag, Graz 1975, S. 77ff
- Recht der Wertpapiere, 12th edition, München, 1986
- Handelsrecht, 24th edition, München 2006
- Lehrbuch des Schuldrechts volume II/2, 13th edition, München 1994
- Die Bedeutung der iustitia distributiva im deutschen Vertragsrecht, Sitzungsberichte der Bayerischen Akademie der Wissenschaften, Jahrgang 1997 Heft 7, München 1997
- Grundrechte und Privatrecht, Berlin New York, 1999
- Schuldrechtsmodernisierung 2002, München 2002.
- Methodenlehre der Rechtswissenschaft, 3rd edition, 1995

== Bibliography ==
- Reinhard Singer: Claus-Canaris (Deutschsprachige Zivilrechtslehrer des 20. Jahrhunderts in Berichten ihrer Schüler, Vol. 2, de Gruyter 2010, ISBN 978-3-89949-457-0, p. 365.
