= Otto Königsberger =

German-Indian architect

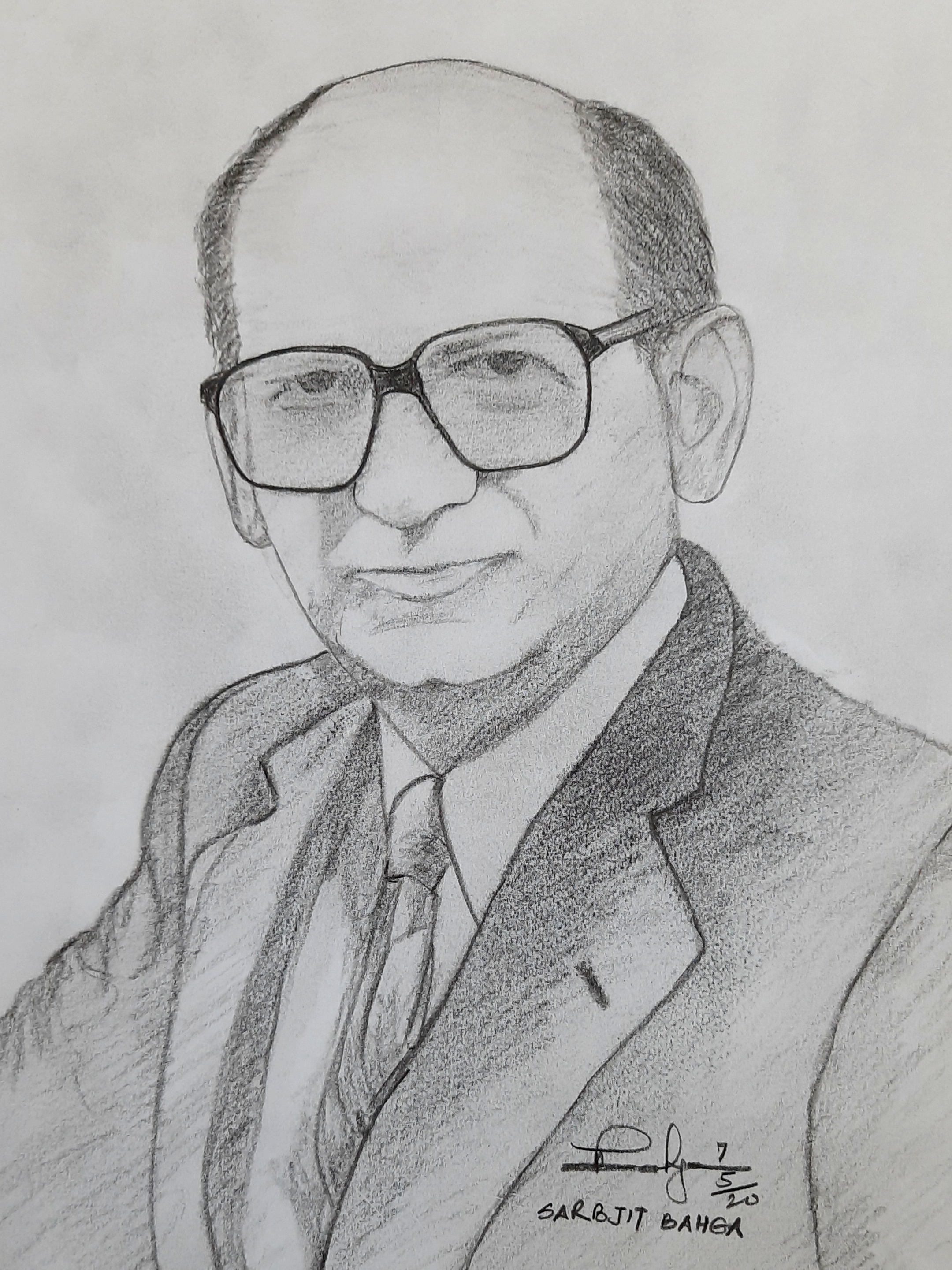
- Born: 13 October 1908; Berlin, Prussia, German Empire
- Died: 3 January 1999 (aged 90); London, United Kingdom
- Citizenship: Germany (1908–1950); India (1950–1991); United Kingdom (1991–1999)
- Occupation: Architect
- Known for: Architecture, Urban planning

Otto H. Königsberger (13 October 1908 – 3 January 1999) was a German-Indian architect who worked mainly in urban development planning in Africa, Asia, and Latin America, with the United Nations. He also proposed plans for developing new cities like Bhubaneswar and Jamshedpur in India.

== Early life ==
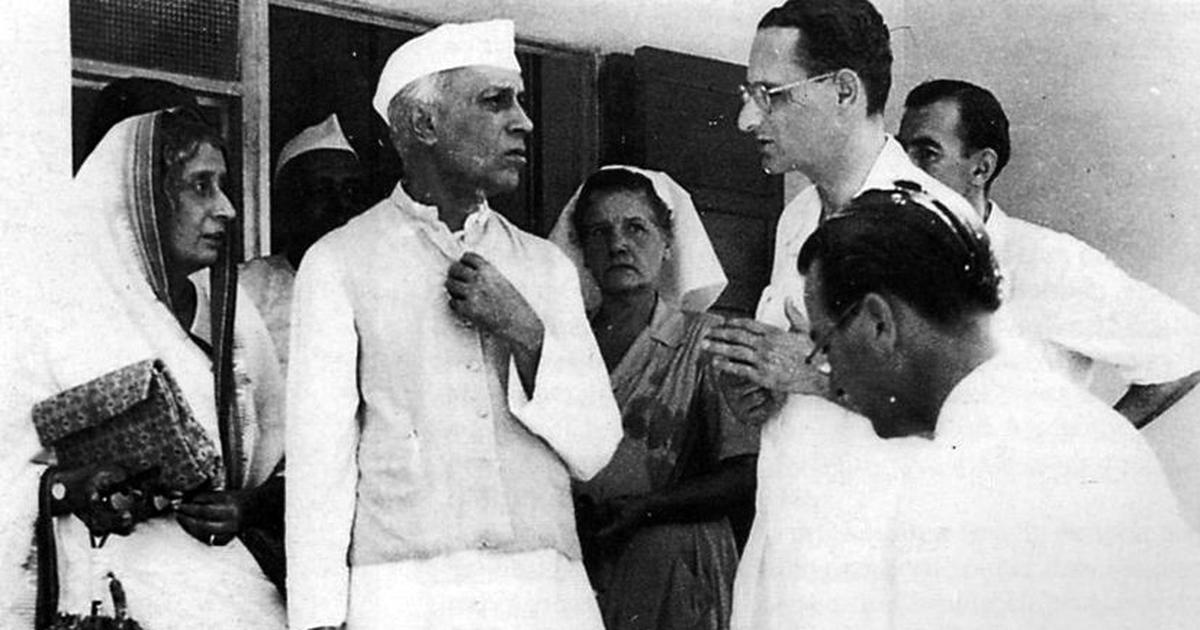
Otto speaking with Jawaharlal Nehru on the latter's visit to the Hindustan Housing Factory, 1950

Königsberger was born in Berlin to a Jewish family in 1908, and trained as an architect at the Technische Hochschule in Charlottenburg (now Technische Universität Berlin), graduating in 1931. In 1933, he won the Schinkel Prize for Architecture for a design for the Olympic Stadium in Berlin. However, with the rise to power of the Nazi Party, Königsberger was forced to leave the country, as was his uncle, physicist Max Born. Königsberger later illustrated Born's popularized physics text, The Restless Universe (published 1935).

Königsberger spent the next six years in the Swiss Institute for the History of Egyptian Architecture in Cairo, where he gained his doctorate. When his uncle Max Born was in Bangalore as a guest of C. V. Raman, the Diwan Mirza Ismail enquired if he knew of any trained architect. Thanks to Born's introduction, Königsberger was appointed chief architect and planner to Mysore State, India in 1939. His buildings during this period include some buildings in the Indian Institute of Science (1943–44), the Tata Institute of Fundamental Research (TIFR) in Bombay (Mumbai), the bus station, Serum Institute and Victory Hall (1946, renamed as Town Hall) in Bangalore. He also practiced urban planning and led the town plan for Bhubaneswar, and was hired by J. R. D. Tata to design a plan for Jamshedpur. After Indian Independence he became director of housing for the Indian Ministry of Health from 1948 to 1951, working on resettling those displaced by partition.

Resident in India since 1939, Königsberger became an Indian citizen in 1950, when he received an Indian passport from the Nehru government. He emigrated to England in 1951, but remained an Indian citizen until 1991, when he was driven to take British citizenship due to the UK government's stance on immigration legislation, which made it problematic for him to receive health care in the United Kingdom.

== Career ==
In 1953 Königsberger moved to London and became head of the Department of Development and Tropical Studies at the Architectural Association, which later became the Development Planning Unit of University College, London, where he worked as a professor until his retirement in 1978.

Königsberger taught that town planners in the developing world should be prepared to dynamically adapt their plans, and involve local communities and techniques, as opposed to imposing a static master plan based on Western ideas – an approach he called Action Planning. He served as a senior adviser to the United Nations Economic and Social Council from the 1950s, and helped launch Habitat International in 1976, which he edited until 1978. His Manual of tropical housing and building was published in several languages and remains a standard course text in many parts of the world. He is credited with introducing Bauhaus style of architecture to India and neighbouring countries.

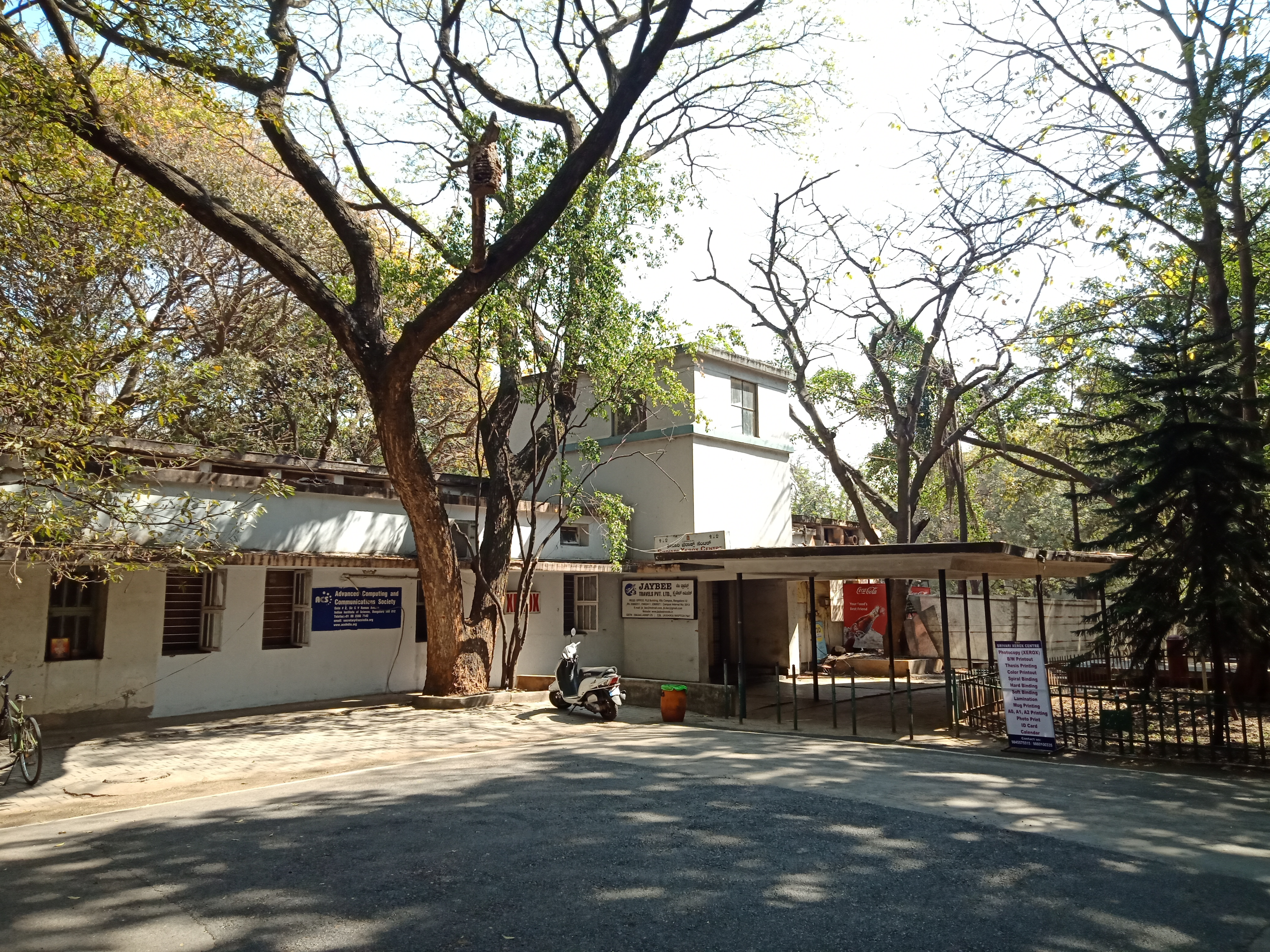
Hydrogen gas plant at IISc, Bangalore (partly demolished in 2021)

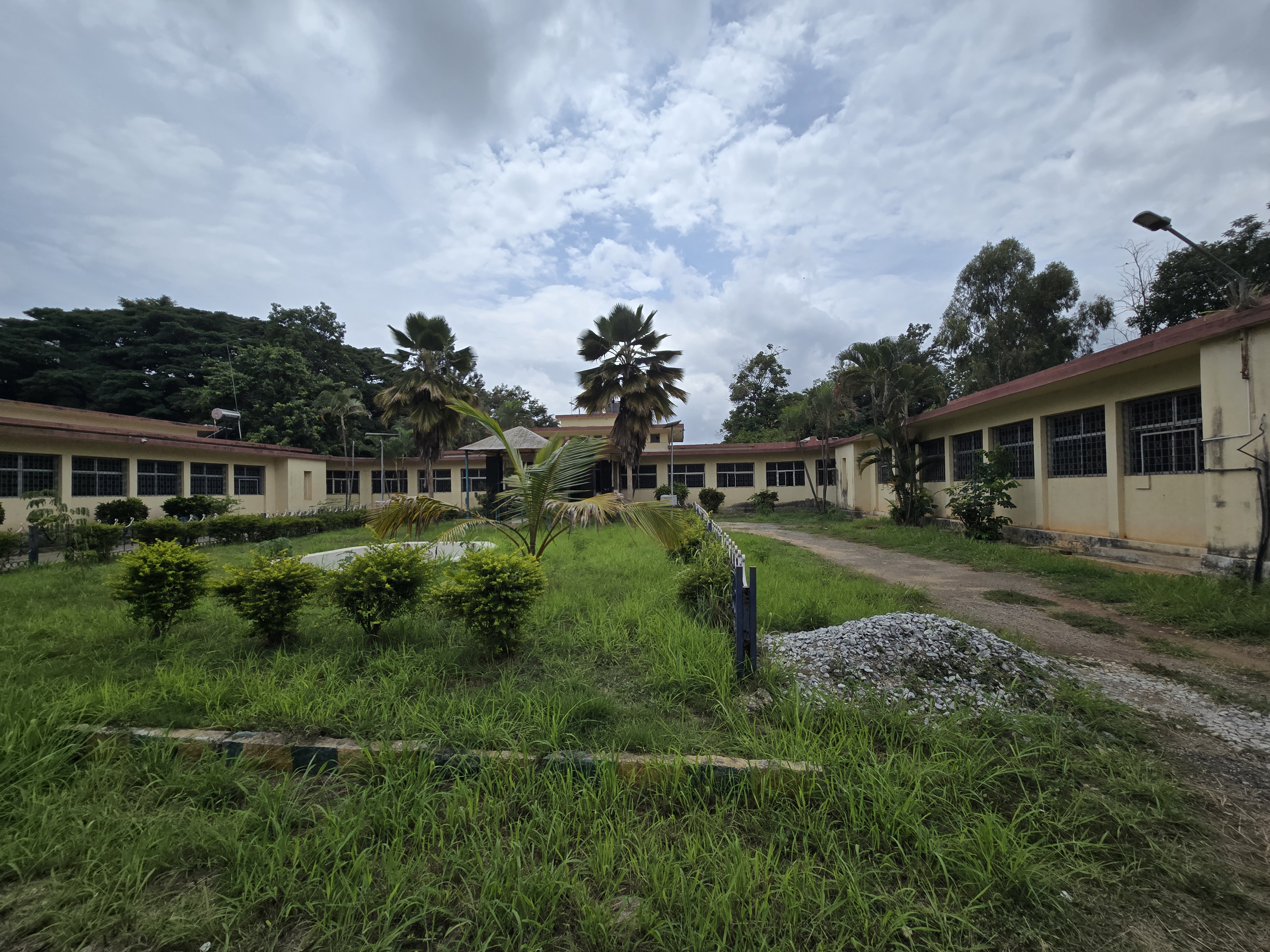
Serum Institute, Bangalore

He stayed in contact with his cousins and developed their shared interests in the Peace Movement, notably Lewis Elton, Andrew Ehrenberg, Gustav Born, Ralph Elliott, Wolf Tillmann, Otto Ehrenberg, Raphael Rosenzweig, and also Victor Ehrenberg and Eugen Rosenstock-Huessy.

== Awards and legacy ==
In 1989, Königsberger was one of the first recipients of the UN Habitat Scroll of Honour, the most prestigious award given by the United Nations in recognition of work carried out in the field of human settlements development. The same year, University College London established the Otto Koenigsberger Scholarship to enable young professionals from developing countries to study urban planning in the UK.

== See also ==
- Mahoney tables

== Bibliography ==
- Abrams, Charles; United Nations. (1959). A housing program for the Philippine Islands. New York: United Nations Technical Assistance Administration.
- Koenigsberger, Otto H.; Steven Groák (1981). A Review of Land Policies. Pergamon Press. p. 200. ISBN 978-0-08-026078-5.
- Koenigsberger, Otto H.; Carl Mahoney; Martin Evans (1971). Climate and House Design. United Nations. p. 93.
- Koenigsberger, Otto H.; S. Groak (1978). Essays in Memory of Duccio Turin, 1926-1976: Construction and Economic. Pergamon Press. p. 204. ISBN 978-0-08-021844-1.
- Bernstein, Beverly; International Urbanization Survey. (1973). Infrastructure problems of the cities of developing countries. New York: International Urbanization Survey, Ford Foundation.
- Koenigsberger, Otto; Tata Iron and Steel Company (1945). Jamshedpur development plan. Bombay: Printed by S. Ramu at the Commercial printing press.
- Koenigsberger, Otto (1952). "New towns in India". Town Planning Review. 23 (2): 95–131. doi:10.3828/tpr.23.2.cpn33402758n8446. ISSN 0041-0020.
- Koenigsberger, Otto H.; Robert Lynn (1965). Roofs in the Warm Humid Tropics. Published for the Architectural Association by Lund, Humphries. p. 56.
- Koenigsberger, Otto; Nations Unies. (1975). The absorption of newcomers in the cities of Developing countries. New York: United Nations.
- Koenigsberger, Otto (1971-02-01). "The City in Newly Developing Countries". Urban Studies. 8 (1): 75–76. doi:10.1080/00420987120080111. ISSN 0042-0980. S2CID 157280569.
- Koenigsberger, Otto H.; Charles Abrams; Steven Groák; Beverly Bernstein (1981). The Work of Charles Abrams: Housing and Urban Renewal in the USA and the. Pergamon Press. p. 268. ISBN 978-0-08-026111-9.
- Lee, Rachel (2012). "Constructing a Shared Vision: Otto Koenigsberger and Tata & Sons". ABE Journal European Architecture Beyond Europe. 2.
