= Helmut Koenigsberger =

British historian (1918–2014)

H. G. Koenigsberger FBA
- Born: Helmut Georg Koenigsberger; 24 October 1918; Berlin, German Empire
- Died: 8 March 2014 (aged 95); London, England
- Other name: Hilary George Kingsley

Academic background
- Education: Gonville and Caius College, Cambridge

Academic work
- Discipline: Historian
- Sub-discipline: Economic history; comparative history; early modern history; early modern Europe; composite monarchy

Helmut Georg Koenigsberger FBA (24 October 1918 – 8 March 2014) was a German-born British historian and academic. He was professor of history at King's College London from 1973 to 1984 and head of its history department.

== Early life ==
Koenigsberger was born in Berlin, the son of Georg Koenigsberger (d. 1932), chief architect of the borough of Treptow, and Käthe, a sister of the physicist Max Born. His elder brother was the architect and planner Otto Königsberger. Although his family were Lutheran Christians, they were classified as Jewish by the Nazis: both of his grandfathers had been non-practising Jews. His immediate family had all fled from Germany before 1939 under the advice of his brother Otto. They received practical help from his uncle Max and from the Quakers: Jewish organisations refused to help them as "[they] were not Jewish by religion".

From 1934, Koenigsberger was educated at Adams' Grammar School, Newport, an all-boys grammar school in Newport, Shropshire, England, before going on to study history at Gonville and Caius College, Cambridge, from 1937 to 1940. On 12 May 1940, just before he was due to sit his Part II Tripos exams (i.e., his 'finals'), he was designated an enemy alien by the British government and sent to a camp on the Isle of Wight and then on to a camp in Canada. While in Canada, it was explained to him that "it would be easier to help him if he were Jewish" and a Jewish organisation offered him help only if he "reconverted to Judaism". After eight months internment, he was allowed to return to the UK. By this stage the University of Cambridge had awarded him a "war degree" on the basis of his Part I exam results only, thereby denying him the possibility of attaining a double first class honours degree and, with it, a postgraduate scholarship - things that he could have achieved if he hadn't been interned.

Koenigsberger spent a short period as a schoolmaster at private schools, working as an assistant master at Brentwood School, Essex from 1941 to 1942 and at Bedford School, Bedfordshire from 1942 to 1944. Knowing that military service would speed up his application for naturalisation, he joined the Royal Navy in July 1944 as a writer, during the latter stages of Second World War. He was required to anglicise his name and choose to be known as Hilary George Kingsley. His work involved deciphering and translating German naval messages while serving aboard British ships, and was often done at night and in secret. He was demobilised in October 1945, although he had wanted to return to Germany to service with the Allied Control Council. He then resumed his birth name and returned to the University of Cambridge to undertake postgraduate research in history. He completed his Doctor of Philosophy (PhD) in 1949: his thesis concerned the government of Sicily in the sixteenth century and its relationship with Habsburg Spain.

== Academic career ==
Koenigsberger's academic career began while he was still a PhD student at Cambridge, during which he had two articles published. The first concerned the revolt of Palermo against Spanish rule in 1647 and was published in The Cambridge Historical Journal in 1946. The second was titled "English merchants in Naples and Sicily in the seventeenth century" and was published in The English Historical Review in 1947. His doctoral thesis was published as a monograph in 1951 with the title "The Government of Sicily Under Philip II of Spain: A Study in the Practice of Empire".

Koenigsberger joined Queen's University, Belfast as a lecturer in economic history in 1948. His research interests moved to comparative studies and the application of statistical analysis to history. He moved to the University of Manchester in 1951, having been appointed a senior lecturer in economic history.

He was Professor of Modern History at the University of Nottingham from 1960 to 1966, before moving to the United States of America where he was Professor of Early Modern History at Cornell University from 1966 to 1973. He returned to the United Kingdom in 1973 and served as professor of history at King's College London until his retirement in 1984. His research covered early modern Europe, and he is credited with its establishment as "a distinct and unified field of study". He is also credited with developing the idea of "composite monarchy" (or "composite state").

== Personal life ==
In 1961, Koenigsberger married Dorothy M. Romano. Together they had twin daughters, Laura and Francesca.

Koenigsberger was a keen violinist, and fell badly protecting his violin. This fall preceded his death, and he died on 8 March 2014, aged 95.

== Honours ==
Koenigsberger was elected a Fellow of the British Academy (FBA) in 1989. He was made a Commander of the Order of Isabella the Catholic by the King of Spain in 1997. He was made an Honorary Fellow of King's College (FKC) in 1999, the highest award that can be bestowed upon an individual by King's College London.

== Bibliography ==
His publications include:

- The Government of Sicily under Philip II of Spain: A Study in the Practice of Empire (Staples Press, 1951).
  - amended and reprinted as The Practice of Empire (Cornell University Press, 1969).
- "The Empire of Charles V in Europe", in G. R. Elton (ed.), The New Cambridge Modern History, vol. 2 (Cambridge 1958), pp. 301–33
- "Decadence or Shift? Changes in the Civilization of Italy and Europe in the Sixteenth and Seventeenth Centuries", Royal Historical Society, 5.10 (1960).
- "Western Europe and the Power of Spain", in R. B. Wernham (ed.), The New Cambridge Modern History, vol. 3 (1968), pp. 234–318
- with G. L. Mosse, Europe in the Sixteenth Century (Cornell University Press, 1968); 2nd ed. with G. L. Mosse & G.Q. Bowler (Longman, 1989), "A General History of Europe" series.
- Estates and Revolutions: Essays in Early Modern European History (Cornell University Press, 1971).
- The Habsburgs and Europe 1516-1660 (Cornell University Press, 1971).
- "The Statecraft of Philip II", European Studies Review, 1 (1971), 1–22
- "The Unity of the Church and the Reformation", Journal of Interdisciplinary History 1 (1971), 407–17 online
- Luther: A Profile (editor, 1973), "World Profiles" series.
- "Republics and Courts in Italian and European Culture in the Sixteenth and Seventeenth Centuries." Past & Present, no.83 (1979): 32-56 online.
- Politicians and Virtuosi: Essays in Early Modern History (Hambledon Press, 1986).
- A History of Europe, vol. 1: Medieval Europe 400-1500; vol. 2: Early Modern Europe 1500-1789 (Longman, 1987); vol. 3 by Asa Briggs.
- "Composite States, Representative Institutions and the American Revolution." Institute of Historical Research, 62.148 (1989): 135–153
- "Prince and States General: Charles V and the Netherlands", Royal Historical Society, 6.4 (1994).
- Monarchies, States Generals and Parliaments: The Netherlands in the 15th and 16th Centuries (Cambridge University Press, 2001).
