= Hans Ehrenberg =

German theologian

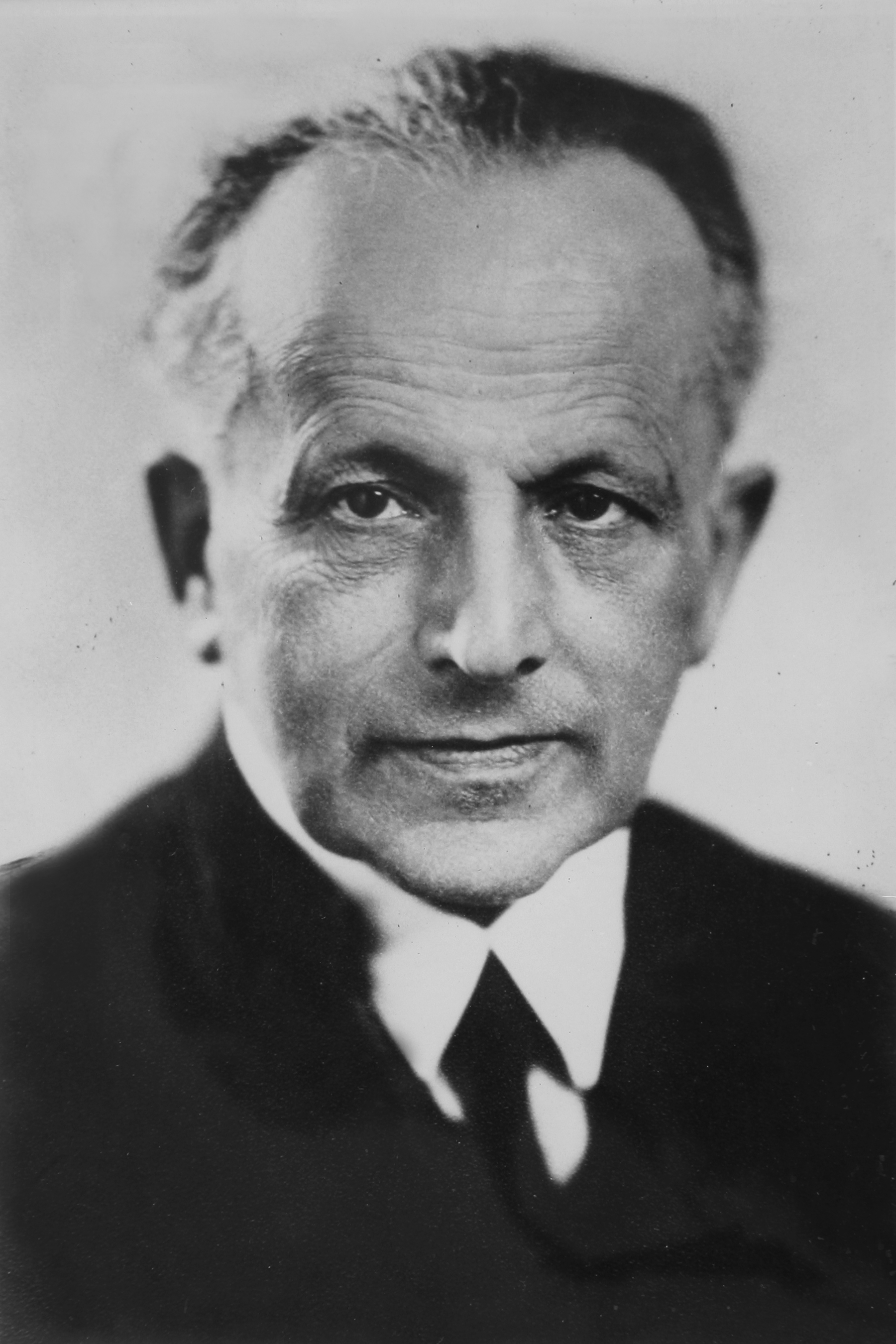
- ca. 1940
- Born: Hans Philipp Ehrenberg; 4 June 1883; Altona, German Empire
- Died: 21 March 1958 (aged 74); Heidelberg, West Germany
- Occupations: professor of philosophy minister, Christuskirche, Bochum
- Years active: 1905–1958
- Spouse: Else Anna Zimmermann
- Children: 2, including Andreas
- Theological work
- Language: German
- Tradition or movement: Protestantism; Confessing Church (co-founder)
- Main interests: Political science, economics, sociology, philosophy, theology, ecumenism, antisemitism, peace, truth, goodness, liberation

Hans Philipp Ehrenberg (German: [hans ˈeː.ʁənbɛʁk]; 4 June 1883 – 21 March 1958) was a German Jewish philosopher and theologian. One of the co-founders of the Confessing Church, he was forced to emigrate to England because of his Jewish ancestry and his opposition to Nazism.

== Life ==
=== 1883–1914 ===
Hans Ehrenberg was born into a liberal Jewish family, the eldest of three children. His parents were Emilie (née Fischel) and Otto Ehrenberg, brother of Victor Ehrenberg, a German jurist, and Richard Ehrenberg, a German economist. His younger brothers were Paul Ehrenberg and the historian Victor Ehrenberg, father of British historian Sir Geoffrey Elton and physicist Lewis Elton. From 1898 to 1900, he attended the Christianeum in Altona. After his graduation exam at the Wilhelm Gymnasium in Hamburg in 1902, he served as a voluntary teacher at the Samsonschule in Wolfenbuettel, and then studied economics, law and political studies (Rechtswissenschaften und Staatswissenschaften) in Göttingen, Berlin, Heidelberg and Munich. His attitude towards workers was already clear by 1906, when he wrote his Ph.D. dissertation on the situation of steel workers (Hüttenarbeiter) in the Ruhr Valley. After his military service in 1907–1908, he continued his studies in philosophy and completed his doctorate in Heidelberg in 1909 and habilitation in 1910. He first became a private docent, then a professor of philosophy at the University of Heidelberg. His philosophical interests included the landscape of peace, truth, goodness and liberation. Ehrenberg was baptised as a Protestant Christian in Berlin in 1911. Around this time, he developed a close friendship with his cousin Franz Rosenzweig, and with Eugen Rosenstock-Huessy, Viktor von Weizsäcker, and Martin Buber. Rosenzweig later claimed that "Ehrenberg was my real teacher in philosophy". In 1913, he married Else Anna Zimmermann (1890–1970), a linguist, teacher and descendant of Martin Luther. They had two children, Juliane and Andreas. One of his uncles was Victor Mordechai Goldschmidt. One of his cousins, Hedwig Ehrenberg, studied physics and mathematics at the University of Goettingen, where she met and later married Max Born. Hans Ehrenberg, with Franz Rosenzweig and Eugen Rosenstock, was in regular correspondence with Louis D Brandeis through the friendship of their maternal families. In view of Hans Ehrenberg's father's and uncles' relatives, friends and acquaintances, and their travels over the lands and voyages across the seas and oceans, the reach of his communications extended to a world-wide network in many countries in all continents.

=== 1914–1933 ===
Ehrenberg volunteered for the First World War and served as a non-commissioned officer, then a lieutenant after late 1914. He won the Iron Cross, 2nd Class as well as the Badische Offiziersorden (Zähringer Löwe 2.Klasse). He left the war and the army early due to reasons of health. He then devoted more time to his philosophical and literary interests.

Ehrenberg had seen the war as a legitimate defensive war, but during this time and afterwards, his views changed completely. He spoke of war crimes and German guilt. He joined the Social Democratic Party (SPD) in 1918, and for 18 months, was a city councilman in Heidelberg, as well as a member of workers' and soldiers' committees. He began making Christian pacifist statements in 1919. In the same year, he received an associate professorship in Heidelberg. At this time, working with Christian socialists, he began to think about becoming a Protestant minister.

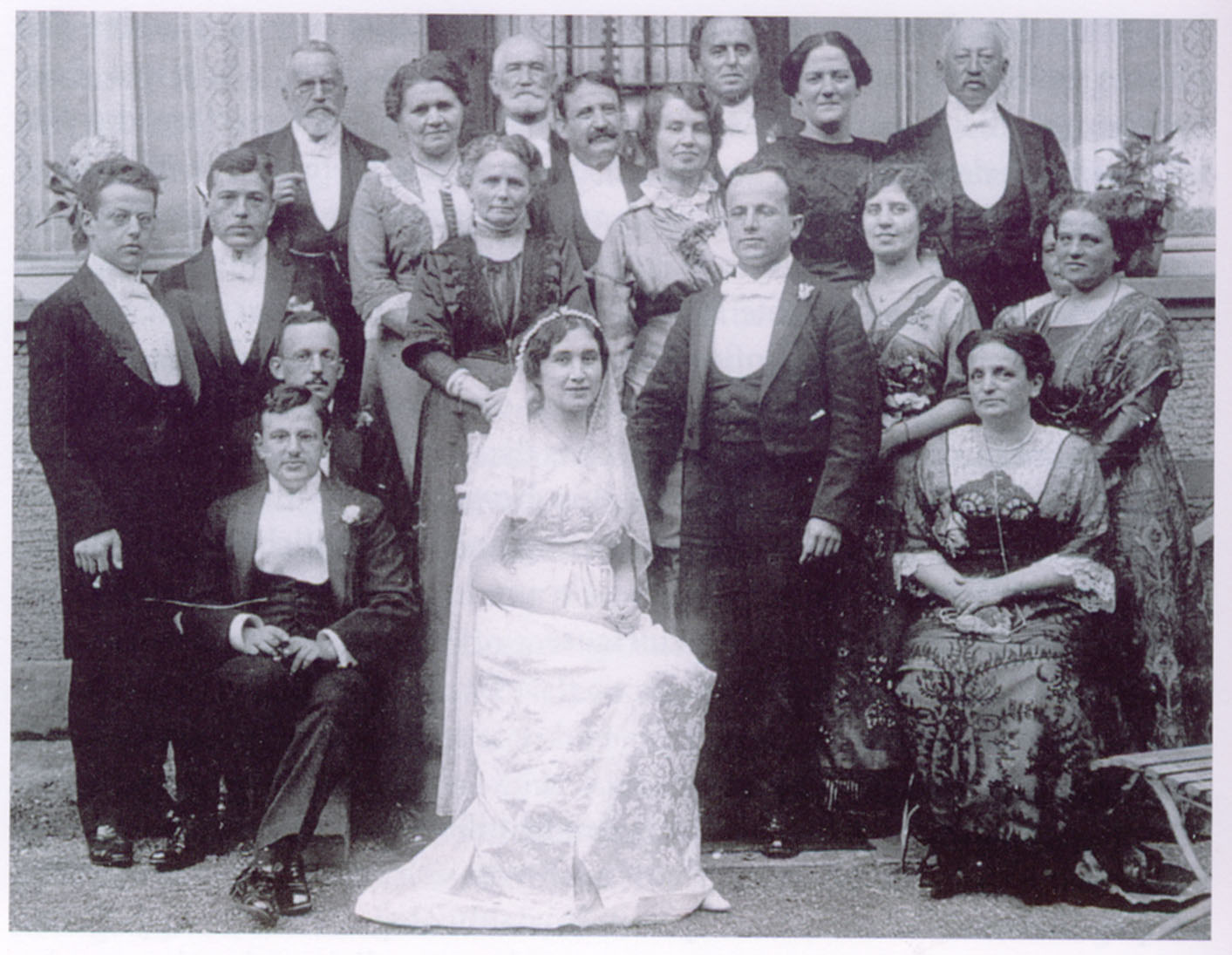
Hans Ehrenberg's marriage to Else Zimmerman, 1913. The wedding party included Franz Rosenzweig and Victor Ehrenberg.

Ehrenberg began his theological studies in Münster, in 1922, completing his second theological exam in 1924. In 1923 and 1925, he and Nicolai von Bubnov published two volumes of German translations of Russian theological writings which were acquired and read by Dietrich Bonhoeffer and twice quoted from an essay that was in the second volume. He attended the World Conference of Life and Work in Stockholm, in 1925, and became friends with Nathan Soderblom and the English ecumenist George Bell. With Eugen Rosenstock-Huessy he was a co-founder, and also a prolific member of the philosophical discussion group and journal, "Die Kreatur", during the time 1925 to 1930.

Abandoning a promising academic career, in 1925, he became the minister of Pauluskirche in Bochum, in a heavily working-class area. He got involved in the Kampfbund christlicher Arbeiter (The Fighting Christian Workers), though he left the SPD, feeling that parish work was incompatible with political party activism. In 1927, he made speeches on church and antisemitism in opposition to riots organised by Nazi brownshirts. One lecture he gave in Hattingen, entitled "The Church and Anti-semitism" prompted a letter of complaint against him to the consistory in Münster:

"We cannot believe that a governing body of our Church approves of a race-conscious Jew who, as a Protestant clergyman, lectures German Protestant Christians about political anti-semitism based on racial attitudes.

=== 1933–1945 ===
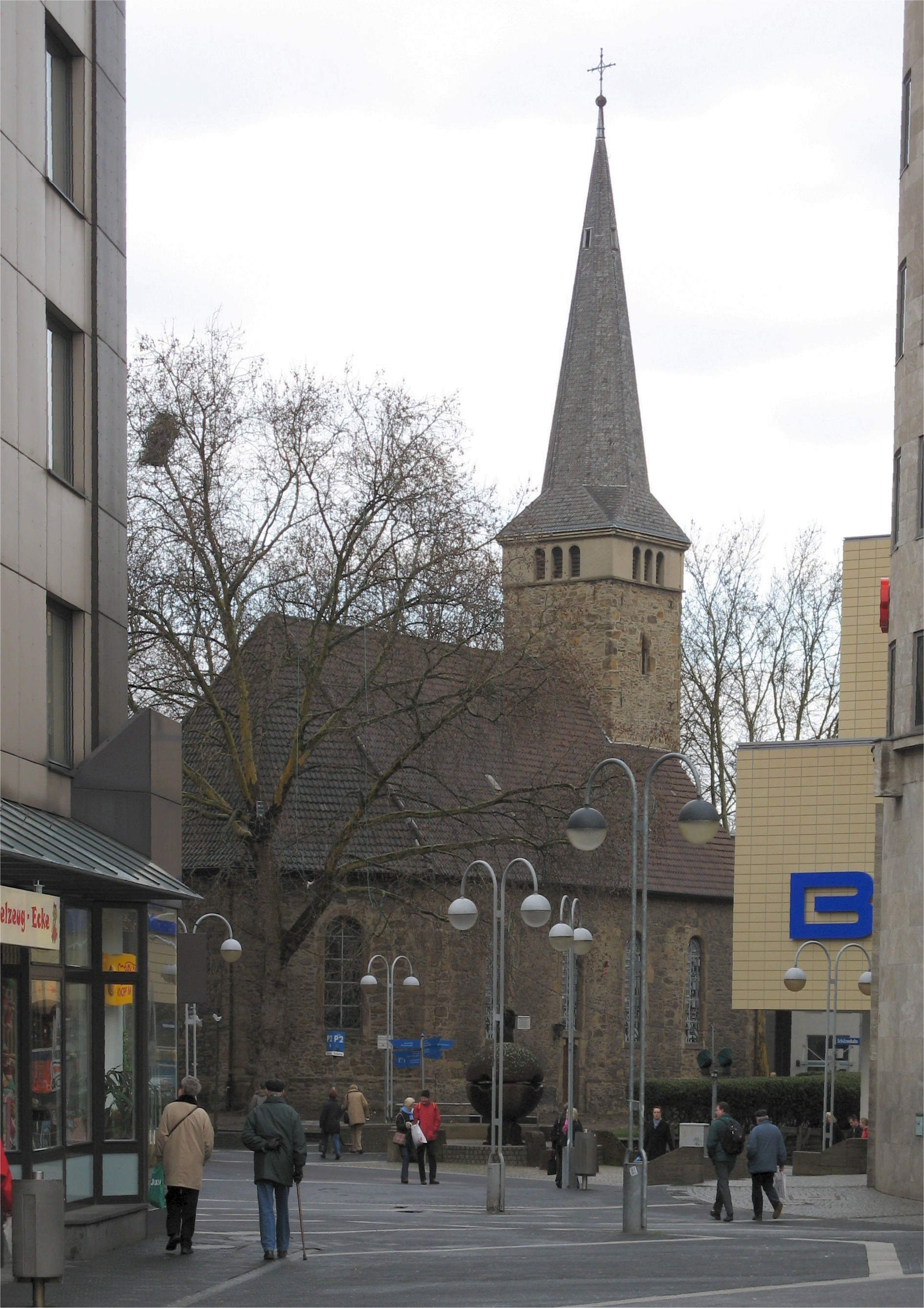
Pauluskirche (St. Paul's Church), where Ehrenberg began preaching in 1925, was completely destroyed in the war and was rebuilt in 1950.

After the Nazis seized power in 1933, more attacks followed and Ehrenberg's moral and pedagogical integrity were put in question.

Ehrenberg became one of the founders of the Confessing Church. He and four other Westphalian ministers had already formulated the "Bochum Confession" in May 1933. The first of its kind, it contained a denial of Nazi ideology and a confession of Christianity's Jewish origins. In July 1933, he published 72 Leitsätze zur judenchristlichen Frage (Seventy-Two Theses to the Jewish-Christian Question), clearly stating his own opposition to antisemitism and calling on the Protestant church to do the same. After he was the target of attacks in Der Stürmer, and facing pressure from the German Christian church authorities, Ehrenberg asked for early retirement in 1937. He continued, however, to work for the Confessing Church, whose ministers in Bochum openly showed solidarity with him.

In September 1938, he was barred from delivering any speech or sermon. His home was destroyed in the pogroms of Kristallnacht and a few days later, he was taken to Sachsenhausen concentration camp. In 1939, he was able to emigrate to England, thanks to the intervention and pledges of Carl Friedrich Goerdeler, Hans Koch and George Bell, Anglican bishop of Chichester. He had had a correspondence with Bell and was perhaps more significant than Franz Hildebrandt or Bonhoeffer in convincing Bell of the growing crisis in German churches under the Nazi state. His family joined him shortly afterward. Ecumenism, religious unity, became increasingly important to him here.

Even though Ehrenberg was strictly anti-communist, his life was saved on several occasions by a communist trade union leader, in the Sachsenhausen concentration camp.

Ehrenberg spoke openly about the German confessional church in England in an effort to prevent the growing disaster in Germany. George Bell also spoke out about Nazi interference in the church. Ehrenberg and George Bell were of the same view that civilians and civilian infrastructure should not be affected by the ongoing war in central Europe.

His close friends included Pastor Dr. Werner Koch, a surviving member of the German resistance and the youngest brother of Hans Koch.

=== 1945–1958 ===
Ehrenberg returned to Germany in 1947, after the war, working as a minister at the Bethel Institution in Bielefeld. In 1953, he returned to Heidelberg, where he died in 1958. His papers are archived at the Westphalian Protestant church archives in Bielefeld. Unlike his colleague and friend, Hermann Maas, he was unable to travel for personal health reasons to Israel after 1950 to visit friends and colleagues there, namely Martin Buber, Raphael Rosenzweig, among others.

== Legacy ==
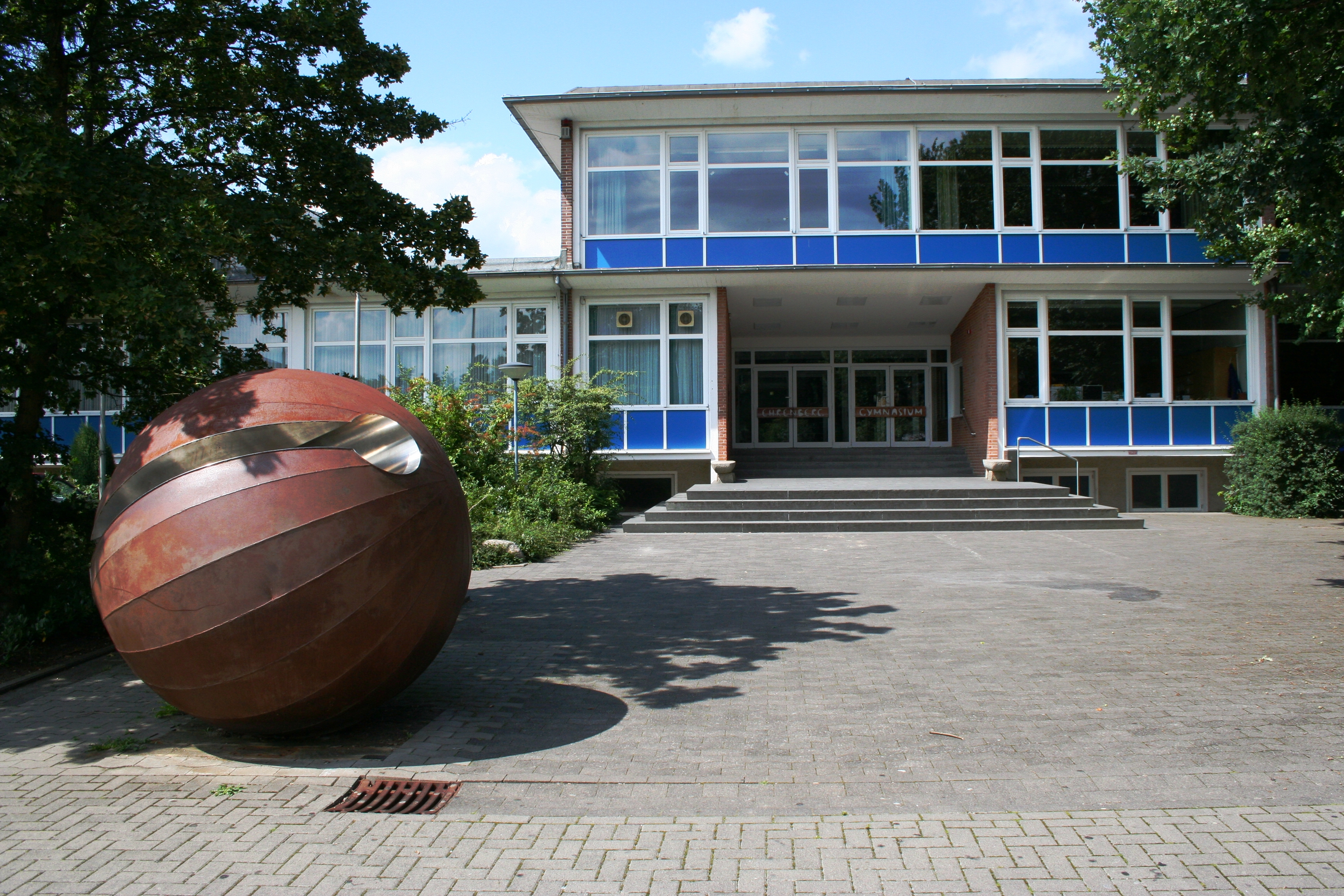
Entrance to Hans Ehrenberg Schule in Bielefeld

Hans Ehrenberg was one of the few German Protestant theologians, even within the Confessing Church, to publicly express his vehement opposition to the antisemitism of the Nazis and publicly declare his support of the Jewish people. He strongly urged the Protestant church to take the same stand. He criticised Christian antisemitism and emphasized the similarities between Judaism and Christianity. Also, his special attitude toward the problems and rights of workers' (since 1905), and world peace (since 1903, also with Franz Rosenzweig and Eugen Rosenstock-Huessy) was in advance of universities, municipal councils, judiciary, governments, parliaments, international organizations and churches of his times, "World Peace without Weapons" (swords into ploughshares). In addition to his practical theological work, he wrote a number of philosophical and theological articles and treatises. One of his favorite quotes from the bible is taken from the Book of Isaiah 60, vs 19 & 20, which was mentioned on their epitaph.

In Ehrenberg's honor and memory, the secondary school administered by the Protestant church in the Bielefeld neighborhood of Sennestadt was renamed the Hans-Ehrenberg-Schule in 1963. There is also a square in Bochum named after him.

== Hans Ehrenberg Prize ==
The Protestant Church Parish of Bochum and the Hans Ehrenberg Society award a prize of €5000 every two years in Ehrenberg's honor. The Hans Ehrenberg Prize is awarded at the Protestant Christuskirche (Christ Church) in Bochum, where Ehrenberg had been pastor. Previous winners are:

- 2000: Prof. Günter Brakelmann, theologian, Ruhr University Bochum (retired)
- 2002: Praeses Manfred Kock and Cardinal Karl Lehmann
- 2004: Prof. Dr. hc. Robert Leicht, University of Erfurt
- 2006: Action Reconciliation Service for Peace
- 2009: Dr. Edna Brocke, teacher of Jewish studies, Ruhr University Bochum
- 2011: Antje Vollmer, former vice president of the Bundestag (Green Party)
- 2013: Manfred Sorg and Eduard Wörmann, leaders in the Evangelical Church of Westphalia
- 2015: Heinrich Bedford-Strohm
- 2017: Wim Wenders
- 2019: Norbert Lammert

== See also ==
- List of peace activists
- Evangelical Church in Germany
- World Council of Churches
- International Council of Christians and Jews
- Liberation Theology
