= Robert Garland =

Robert Garland may refer to:

- Robert Garland (choreographer), American artistic director, dancer and choreographer
- Robert Garland (historian) (born 1947), British classical philologist and historian
- Robert Garland (screenwriter) (1937–2020), American screenwriter and film producer
- Bob Garland (1920–2004), Scottish trade unionist
