= Reformation Europe, 1517–1559 =

- First US edition
- Author: Geoffrey Elton
- Publisher: Collins (UK); Harper & Row (US)
- Publication date: 1963
- Pages: 348pp.

Reformation Europe, 1517–1559 is a 1963 book written by Geoffrey Elton.

== Content ==
The book is an analysis of the religious, economic, cultural and political history of Europe during the period of the Reformation. He examines the history of the period through the interrelationships between different forces in Europe at the time, such as the Holy Roman Emperor Charles V, the Papacy, reformers such as Martin Luther, John Calvin, Martin Bucer and Zwingli, and explores the resultant Counter-Reformation and the beginnings of European colonisation of other parts of the world such as South America. Its central focus is upon the conflict between Luther and Charles V.

According to one scholar, the book was written in a way which helped Reformation studies to emerge from a partisan situation where Protestant history was largely written by Protestants and Catholic history written by Catholics, in this sense representing the 'secularisation' of the period's historical interpretation. Elton also wrote from a particular intellectual framework of his own, however, being antithetical towards radical movements such as the Anabaptists in a way that drew some criticism at the time of publication.

Much of the work is largely narrative and chronological in tone and structure, though there are important points of interpretation: one key conclusion that Elton comes to, for example, is a repudiation of the Weberian thesis of a link between the Protestant revolution and a nascent 'spirit of capitalism' associated with a rising middle-class. Elton asserts that there is not ample factual evidence to support such a framework and concludes that it is sad that so many historians have devoted their time and energy to what he perceives of as an illusory belief.

== Chapters ==
- 1. Luther
- The Attack on Rome
- The State of Germany
- 2. Charles V
- 3. Years of Triumph
- The Progress of Lutheranism
- Zwingli
- The Wars of Charles V
- 4. The Radicals
- 5. Outside Germany
- The South
- The West
- The North
- The East
- 6. The Formation of Parties
- The Emergence of Protestantism
- The Search for a Solution
- 7. The Revival of Rome
- Catholic Reform
- Counter-Reformation
- The Jesuits & the New Papacy
- 8. Calvin
- The Meaning of Calvinism
- The Reformation in Geneva
- The Spread of Calvinism
- 9. War & Peace
- The Triumph of Charles V
- The Defeat of Charles V
- The End of an Age
- 10. The Age
- The Religious Revolution
- Art, Literature & Learning
- The Nation State
- Society
- The Expansion of Europe
