= Victor Ehrenberg (jurist) =

German jurist (1851–1929)

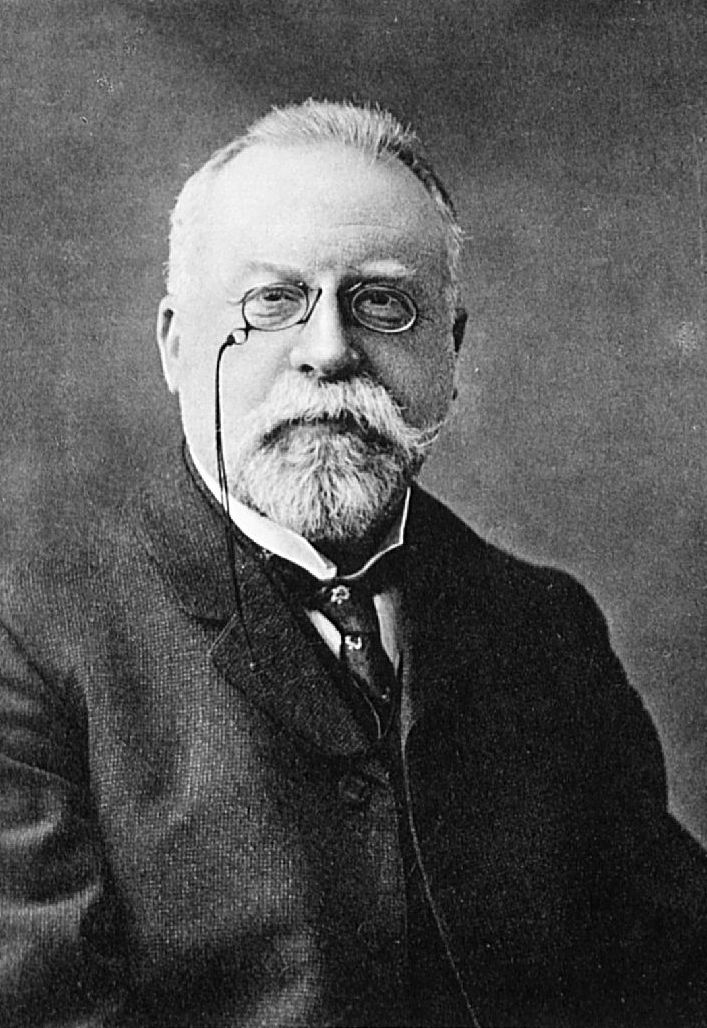
- Ehrenberg in 1926
- Born: Victor Gabriel Ehrenberg; 22 August 1851; Wolfenbüttel, Duchy of Brunswick in the German Confederation
- Died: 10 March 1929 (aged 77); Göttingen, Germany
- Occupation: Jurist
- Spouse: Elise Marie A. Helene von Jhering (died 1920)
- Children: 1
- Relatives: Richard Ehrenberg (brother); Victor Ehrenberg (nephew); Hans Ehrenberg (nephew); Geoffrey Elton (great-nephew); Lewis Elton (great-nephew); Andrew S. C. Ehrenberg (great-nephew); Olivia Newton-John (great-granddaughter); Ben Elton (great-great-nephew)

Victor Gabriel Ehrenberg (22 August 1851 – 10 March 1929) was a German jurist.

== Biography ==
Ehrenberg was born in Wolfenbüttel, Duchy of Brunswick. He was the son of a Jewish couple, Philipp Samuel Ehrenberg and Julie Fischel, Principal of the Samson School in Wolfenbüttel. After gymnasium in Wolfenbüttel he studied legal science in Göttingen, Leipzig, Heidelberg and Freiburg. His brothers were Otto Ehrenberg and Richard Ehrenberg.

He gave lectures at the Universities of Göttingen (from 1877), Rostock (1882), again Göttingen (1888) and then Leipzig (1911–1922).

Ehrenberg married Elise Marie A. Helene von Jhering (1852–1920), daughter of the legal historian Rudolf von Jhering (1818–1892). Ehrenberg died in Göttingen on 10 March 1929.

His son Rudolf Ehrenberg was professor of physiology and medicine at the University of Göttingen and his daughter Hedwig Martha Ehrenberg (1891–1972) studied mathematics and theoretical physics (Ph.D.) and married scientist Max Born.

Ehrenberg was a great-grandfather of Australian singer and actress Olivia Newton-John, an uncle of historian Victor Ehrenberg, a great-uncle of physicist and education researcher Lewis Elton and of historian Geoffrey Elton, and a great-great uncle of comedian and writer Ben Elton.

== Works ==
- Versicherungsgeschichte, 1893
- Die deutsche Rechtsgeschichte und die juristische Bildung, 1894
