= Lewis Elton =

German-born British physicist (1923–2018)

- Born: Ludwig Richard Benjamin Ehrenberg; 25 March 1923; Tübingen, Germany
- Died: 29 September 2018 (aged 95); Surrey, England
- Education: Christ's College, Cambridge; Regent Street Polytechnic; University College London
- Occupations: Physicist, researcher
- Children: 4, including Ben Elton
- Parents: Victor Ehrenberg; Eva Dorothea Sommer
- Relatives: Geoffrey Elton (brother); Hans Ehrenberg (uncle); Andrew S. C. Ehrenberg (cousin); Victor Ehrenberg (great-uncle); Richard Ehrenberg (great-uncle)

Lewis Richard Benjamin Elton (born Ludwig Richard Benjamin Ehrenberg; 25 March 1923 – 29 September 2018) was a German-born British physicist and researcher into education, specialising in higher education.

== Early life ==
Born in Tübingen to the scholars Victor Ehrenberg and Eva Dorothea Sommer, Ehrenberg moved with his family to Prague in 1929, and from there to England in February 1939, to escape Nazi persecution of the Jews. Ehrenberg naturalised as a British subject and changed his name by deed poll in June 1947. He was educated at Rydal School in Colwyn Bay, and thereafter at Christ's College, Cambridge, the Regent Street Polytechnic, London, and University College London. It was from the latter institution that he was awarded his PhD, in 1950.

== Career ==
He was Professor of Physics at Battersea College of Technology from 1964 until 1970. The College completed its transformation into the University of Surrey (and its relocation from Battersea to Guildford) in 1970. He founded the Institute of Educational Technology in 1967, the first of its kind. He was somewhat of a pioneer and innovator in the professional development of university teachers and became Professor of Higher Education in 1970, a post he held until 1988. The Institute became internationally renowned and his philosophy is one that has been adopted by many universities around the world.

In 1994, he was appointed Professor of Higher Education at University College London, where he founded the Higher Education Research and Development Unit (now the Centre for the Advancement of Learning and Teaching). He became an honorary professor there in 2003. He was appointed Visiting Professor of Higher Education at Manchester University in August 2005.

He was a Fellow of the American Institute of Physics and a Fellow of the Society for Research into Higher Education. He was awarded a Lifetime Achievement award at the 2005 Times Higher Awards, at which Baroness Kennedy said "there is a polymath quality to this man that points to someone interested in educating the whole person."

== Lewis Elton Gallery, University of Surrey ==
In 1963, at the Surrey University Battersea campus, Elton started a project to show original artworks in the Physics Department. When the University Gallery at Guildford was relocated in 1997, the gallery was dedicated to Elton and was named the Lewis Elton Gallery. The gallery hosts regular exhibitions of paintings, photographs and sculpture.

== Lewis and Mary Elton Art Collection ==
The donation of a collection of paintings and objets d'art was made to University of Surrey including works by Picasso, Chagall, Klee and Cocteau. The gift was marked by an exhibition at The Lightbox gallery, Woking, in January 2012.

== Personal life and death ==
His older brother was the historian Geoffrey Elton. Lewis married Mary Foster, whom he met at university and one of their four children is the comedian and author Ben Elton. Lewis died in September 2018, aged 95.

== See also ==
- Ehrenberg (surname)
