= Hermann Maas =

Hermann Ludwig Maas (German: [ˈhɛʁ.man ˈmaːs]; 5 August 1877 – 27 September 1970) was a Protestant minister, a doctor of theology and named one of the Righteous Among the Nations, a title given by the Israeli organization for study and remembrance of the Holocaust - Yad Vashem, for people who helped save the lives of Jews during the Holocaust without seeking to gain thereby.

== Biography ==
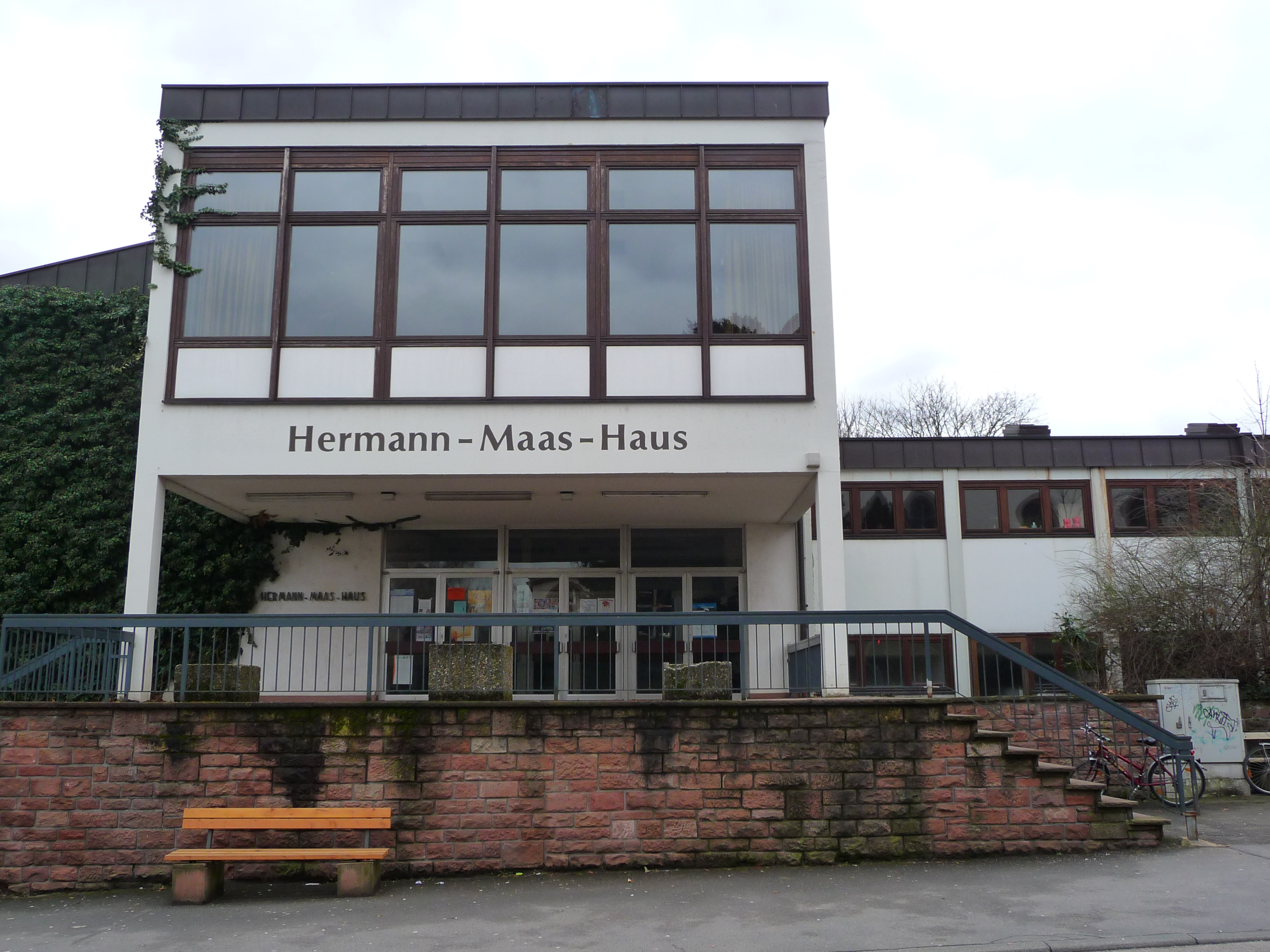
The Herrmann-Maas-Haus in Heidelberg-Kirchheim.

Maas was born in Gengenbach in the Schwarzwald, Germany.

In 1903, he started working as a Protestant minister in a parish of Evangelical Church in Baden. At the same time he began to make the acquaintance of Zionist Jews, and formed friendly relations with many of them, having attended the Sixth Zionist Congress in Basel that year. Since 1918, he had been an active member of the pro-democratic left-liberal DDP. Maas, who had decidedly liberal and pacifist views, caused a scandal in 1925 by attending the funeral of social democratic Reichspräsident Friedrich Ebert. Conservative German pastors considered this to be an affront to the church because Ebert had been an outspoken atheist.

In 1932, Maas joined an association for protection against antisemitism. In 1933, when the Nazi regime introduced the economic boycott of the Jews of Germany, Maas first went to Palestine to meet with some of the Zionist activists, impressing them by speaking fluent Hebrew. Upon his return to Heidelberg he faced harsh criticism as a "Jew-lover". After Hitler's Machtergreifung ("seizure of power") he joined the Pfarrernotbund and the Confessing Church along with other notable Protestant theologians such as Dietrich Bonhoeffer, Martin Niemöller and Hans Ehrenberg. In the early 1940s, Maas helped many Jews flee from Germany by using his connections to obtain exit visas. In mid-1943, on the instigation of the Nazi regime the Superior Church Council of the Baden Church forced him out of office for his activism. In 1944, he was sent to a forced-labor camp in France, from which he was later released by the US forces. In 1945 he resumed work as minister for the Baden Church.

In 1950, Maas was the first non-Jewish German to be officially invited to the newly formed state of Israel. On July 28, 1964, Yad Vashem decided to recognize Reverend Hermann Maas as one of the Righteous Among the Nations. A street in Rehovot (in the eastern suburb of Qiryat HaYovel) is named after him and a grove inside "Orde Wingate Forest" at Mount Gilboa.

He died on 27 September 1970 in Mainz-Weisenau.
