= The Practice of History =

1967 book by Geoffrey Elton

- Author: Geoffrey Elton
- Publisher: Fontana Books
- Publication date: United Kingdom; 1967

The Practice of History is a 1967 book by the historian Geoffrey Elton published by Fontana Books. It is an examination of Elton's ideas of how history is, and should be, written.

== Content ==
Elton's analysis of the historical method is one that is founded upon certain clear and fundamental principles and ideas that he thought lay behind history on the one hand and the construction of narrative by the historian on the other. Primarily this included the notion that the historian reconstructed events and phenomena that had actually occurred in objective reality through the process of rigorous analysis of documentary sources. Historical facts themselves are, therefore, conceived as being independent of the observer rather than being affected and coloured by the perspective adopted by the observer. Elton's focus is emphatically upon history as a series of events rather than states as the foundation of his concept of what constitutes historical facts.

Elton does not theorize that absolute objectivity is possible and argues instead that there are limits to historical knowledge (he even goes as far to admit that "for the greater part of history we shall always know very little or nothing concerning such things"), but is adamant that the vocation of the historian is to attempt to manifest the reality of the past as well as possible, given his view that there exists a "dead reality independent of the inquiry." Elton also argues that it is important to follow certain key principles in writing history, such as the process of putting questions to past documents which do not manifest bias towards an answer that is already in mind, or the bearing in mind that people living in the past did not have the benefit of hindsight that the historian himself has.

He also argued in favour of a general focus upon a political and constitutional history of Britain by British historians, as opposed to the rising forces of social, cultural and postcolonial historiography in his own time period.

Elton's work contrasts with the ideas of other historians such as E. H. Carr, whose views of the historical process Elton saw as being characterised by a dangerous relativism.

Elton proposes that historical scholarship is akin to a form of craftsmanship, with young scholars needing to undertake an apprenticeship in order to learn the process (or techne). In particular, the skill that is required is that of explaining historical change, and the deducing of consequences from disparate facts.
