= Robert Garland (historian) =

Classical scholar (born 1947)

- Born: September 25, 1947 (age 79)
- Education: Manchester University (B.A.); McMaster University (M.A.); University College London (Ph.D.)
- Occupations: Classical Philologist, Historian, Professor at Colgate University
- Awards: Fulbright Scholarship, George Grote Prize in Ancient History Prize
- Scientific career
- Fields: Classical History

Robert S.J. Garland (born September 25, 1947) is a British classical philologist and historian. He is currently the Roy D. and Margaret B. Wooster Professor of the Classics at Colgate University in Hamilton, New York.

== Biography ==
Garland earned his Bachelor of Arts in Classics at Manchester University, and later his Master of Arts in Classics at McMaster University. He received his doctorate in Ancient History from University College London. Garland has been a Fulbright Scholar and received the George Grote Ancient History Prize. He is a professor at Colgate University, and has taught at the British School of Archeology in Athens.

Garland has written numerous books on ancient Greco-Roman history and has been a consultant for many educational productions such as the Last Stand of the 300 by the History Channel.

== Bibliography ==
- Garland, Robert 1985 The Greek Way of Death, New York: Cornell University Press
- Garland, Robert 1987 The Piraeus: From the Fifth to the First Century B.C., London: Duckworth
- Garland, Robert 1990 The Greek Way of Life: From Conception to Old Age, New York: Cornell University Press
- Garland, Robert 1992 Introducing New Gods: The Politics of Athenian Religion, New York: Cornell University Press
- Garland, Robert 1994 Religion and the Greeks, Bristol: Bristol Classical Press
- Garland, Robert 1995 The Eye of the Beholder: Deformity and Disability in the Graeco-Roman World, New York: Cornell University Press
- Garland, Robert 1998 Daily Life of the Ancient Greeks, Westport (Connecticut): Greenwood Press
- Garland, Robert 2003 Julius Caesar, Bristol: Bristol Phoenix Press
- Garland, Robert 2004 Surviving Greek Tragedy, London: Duckworth
- Garland, Robert 2006 Celebrity in Antiquity: From Media Tarts to Tabloid Queens, London: Duckworth
- Garland, Robert 2010 Hannibal, Bristol: Bristol Classical Press
- Garland, Robert 2013 Ancient Greece: Everyday Life in the Birthplace of Western Civilization, Sterling Press
- Garland, Robert 2014 Wandering Greeks: The Ancient Greek Diaspora from the Age of Homer to the Death of Alexander the Great, Princeton: Princeton University Press
- Garland, Robert 2017 Athens Burning: The Persian Invasion of Greece and the Evacuation of Attica, Baltimore (Maryland): Johns Hopkins University Press
- Garland, Robert 2025 What to Expect When You're Dead: An Ancient Tour of Death and the Afterlife, Princeton: Princeton University Press
