= Culpa in contrahendo =

Latin expression meaning "fault in conclusion of a contract"

Culpa in contrahendo is a Latin expression meaning "fault in conclusion of a contract". It is an important concept in contract law for many civil law countries, which recognize a clear duty to negotiate with care, and not to lead a negotiating partner to act to his detriment before a firm contract is concluded. It was coined in the 1861 by Rudolf von Jhering. In German contract law, § 311 II BGB lists a number of steps by which an obligation to pay damages may be created.

By contrast, in English contract law, and many other common law jurisdictions, there has been stunted judicial acceptance of this concept. The doctrine of estoppel has been mooted by academics as a good model, but judges have refused to let it be a sidestep of the doctrine of consideration, saying estoppel must be a shield not a sword, and calling instead for Parliamentary intervention. On the other hand, in the case of land, proprietary estoppel effectively created obligations regardless of any pre-existing contract. In the United States, however, courts have allowed promissory estoppel to function as a substitute for the consideration doctrine. This movement was stimulated by the acceptance of the concept in section 90 of the first Restatement of Contracts.

== German law ==
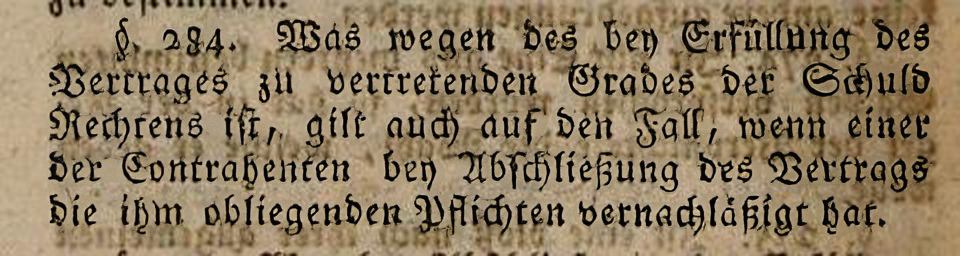
General State Laws for the Prussian States law which introduced the concept of (though not the name) in the German legal system

Rudolf von Jhering is credited with developing the doctrine of culpa in contrahendo in a 1861 article. While there already existed a norm in the 1791 General State Laws for the Prussian States that made the same liability standard that applies to faulty performance also apply if, at the time of concluding the contract, one party neglects their pre-contractual duties. This norm was not taken notice of in the scientific literature. Originally, according to the prevailing interpretation of the German Civil Code, there was no such legal doctrine. The courts saw a gap in the law and used the culpa in contrahendo doctrine to fill it.

Since the 2002 reform of the law of obligations, culpa in contrahendo is provided for by statute §311(2) in connection with §§280(1) and 241(2) of the German Civil Code).

== Belgian law ==
Article 1382 of the Belgian Civil Code is the general legal basis to pursue compensation for damage as a result of a culpa in contrahendo. Article 5.17 of the new Belgian Civil Code juncto Art 6.5 of the same Code are dispositions that explain the " culpa in contrahendo"

== United States ==
The doctrine of culpa in contrahendo applies in the US territory of Puerto Rico. It sometimes is cited in Louisiana.

== See also ==
- Waltons Stores Ltd v Maher
- Friedrich Kessler and Edith Fine, Culpa in Contrahendo, Bargaining in Good Faith, and Freedom of Contract: A Comparative Study, 77 Harv. L. Rev. 401 (1964).
