= Grote Prize =

The George Grote Prize in Ancient History is an early career academic prize for notable unpublished work by emerging scholars in the field of ancient history.

The prize, named for historian George Grote, was first awarded in 1982 and has been awarded by the Institute of Classical Studies, University of London, every two to three years since. A cash prize of £3000 is funded by an endowment left by Victor Ehrenberg.

== Recipients ==
Winners, who are selected based on a thesis on a subject of their own choosing, must be members of a University of London institution and have completed no more than four years of full-time research (or the part-time equivalent). Entries are judged by a committee of teachers of ancient history within the University of London. Winners are announced in the German review journal Gnomon.

Past winners have included Robin Osborne, Armand D'Angour and Charles Crowther.

== See also ==
- List of history awards
- Conington Prize
