= Hans Koch (lawyer) =

German resistance member

- Hans Koch
- Born: 16 August 1893; Bartenstein, East Prussia, German Empire
- Died: 24 April 1945 (aged 51); Berlin, Germany
- Cause of death: extrajudicial killing
- Education: University of Königsberg
- Occupation: lawyer
- Spouse: Annemarie Kahle

Hans Koch (16 August 1893 – 24 April 1945) was a German lawyer, a member of the Confessing Church and a member of the German resistance against Nazism. The plotters of 20 July slated Koch for President of the Reichsgericht in post-Nazi Germany.

== Early life ==
Koch was born in Bartenstein, East Prussia (modern Bartoszyce, Poland), he graduated in law from the University of Königsberg. In 1923, he began working at the Prussian Ministry of Trade and later as the second state commissar of the Berlin stock exchange. In 1927, he opened his own law office.

== Opposition against the Nazi regime ==
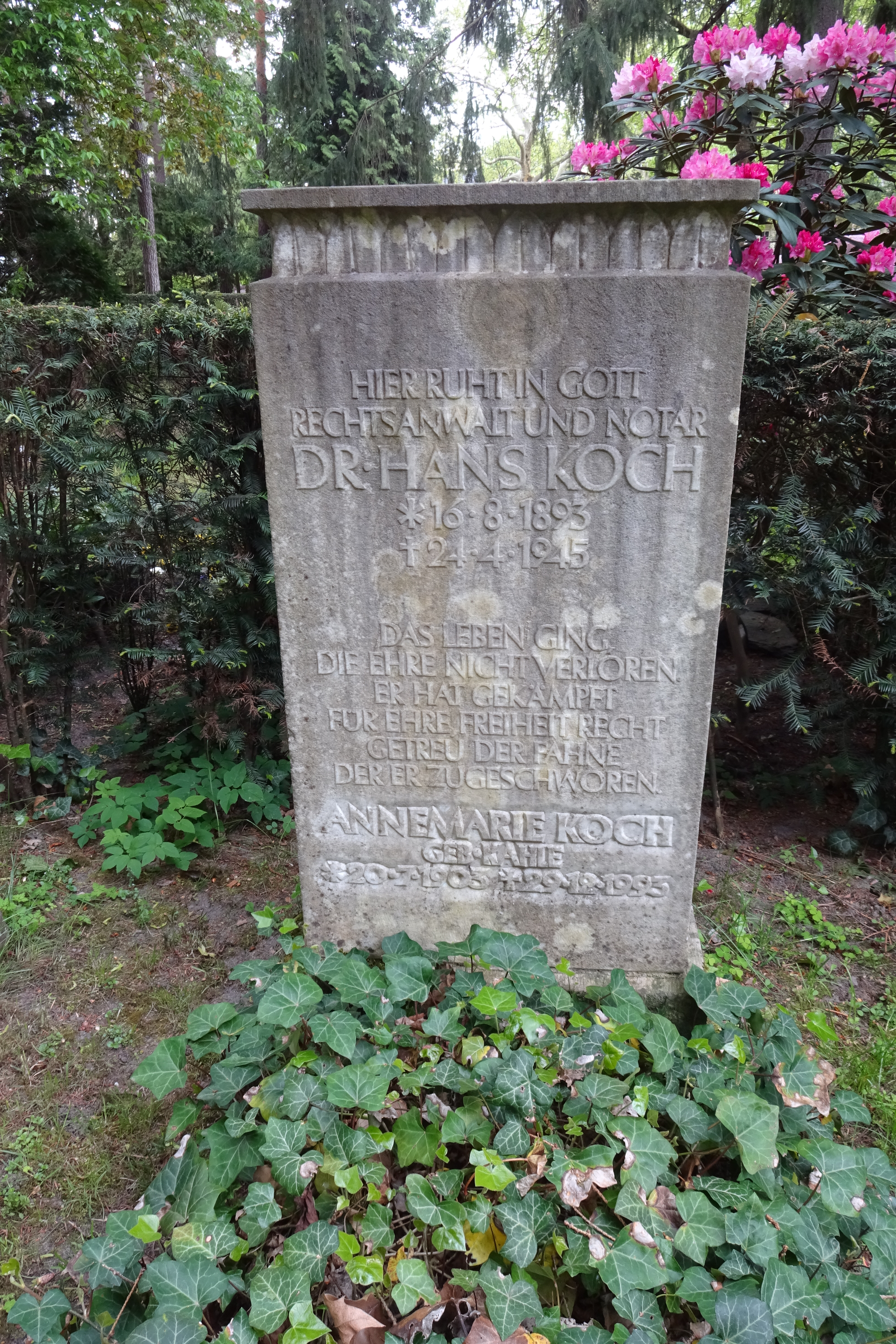
Grave of Hans Koch, Nikolassee Cemetery, Berlin

In 1937, he helped win an acquittal for pastor Martin Niemöller. During World War II, he developed contacts with the 20 July plot conspirators, including Hans von Dohnanyi and Hans Oster from the military-intelligence. In the 20 July plot, once the Nazis had been routed, Koch was slated to become the presiding judge of the Reichsgericht, the highest court in the German Reich. The plot failed, however, and Koch sheltered Hans Bernd Gisevius, one of the conspirators. An informer denounced him and Koch and his family were arrested. He was killed extrajudicially in Berlin by a SS-Sonderkommando of the Reich Security Main Office on 24 April 1945.

== Sources ==
- Badenheuer, Konrad (October 2009). "Mit dem Leben bezahlt – Hans Koch". Preußische Allgemeine Zeitung (in German). 31 (44): 10.
- Ludwig, H (2008). Schultze, Harald (ed.). Ihr Ende Schaut an ...” Evangelische Märtyrer des 20. Jahrhunderts (in German). Evangelische Verlagsanstalt. pp. 360–362. ISBN 9783374023707.
- Sandvoß, Hans-Rainer (2014). “Es wird gebeten die Gottesdienste zu überwachen ...” Religionsgemeinschaften in Berlin zwischen Anpassung, Selbstbehauptung und Widerstand von 1933 bis 1945 (in German). Lukas-Verlag. p. 304. ISBN 9783867321846.
- Sigler, Sebastian (2014). Corpsstudenten Im Widerstand Gegen Hitler (in German). Duncker & Humblot. pp. 45–56. ISBN 9783428143191.
- Steinbach, Peter (1998). Lexikon Des Widerstandes 1933 - 1945 (in German). Beck. pp. 115–116. ISBN 340643861X.
- Ziemann, Benjamin (2019). Martin Niemöller ein Leben in Opposition. Deutsche Verlags-Anstalt. ISBN 9783421047120
