= Paul Ehrenberg =

German painter

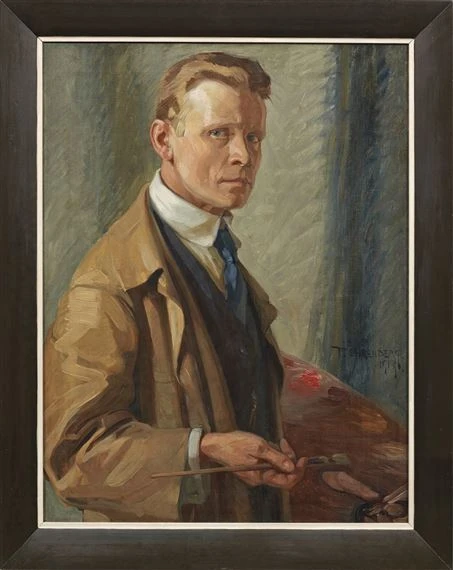
Paul Ehrenberg, self portrait, 1913

Paul Ehrenberg (1876–1949) was a German violinist and impressionist painter, brother of Carl Ehrenberg and half-brother of Hilde Distel.

Ehrenberg was a student of the painter Heinrich von Zügel. He was a member of the Luitpoldsgruppe and Künstlergenossenschaft. His work, shown in many Munich exhibitions, included portraits, still lifes, landscapes, and animal paintings. He married the painter Lilly Teufel.

Ehrenberg was an excellent violinist, who often played chamber music with Thomas Mann. Based on the evidence of Thomas Mann's letters and diaries, Mann was infatuated with Ehrenberg, and they had an intense personal relationship from 1899 to about 1903. Mann based several characters in his published writings on him.

== See also ==
- List of German painters
