= Andrew S. C. Ehrenberg =

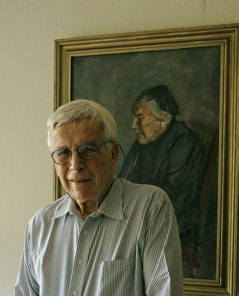
- Born: 1 May 1926; Bochum, Germany
- Died: 25 August 2010 (aged 84); London, UK
- Spouse: Clemency (Miles) Ehrenberg
- Parents: Hans Ehrenberg; Else Zimmermann
- Relatives: Victor Ehrenberg (uncle); Geoffrey Elton (cousin); Lewis Elton (cousin); Victor Ehrenberg (great-uncle); Richard Ehrenberg (great-uncle)
- Website: http://www.marketingscience.info/name-and-founders

Andrew Ehrenberg (1 May 1926 – 25 August 2010) was a statistician and marketing scientist whose research focused on statistical methodology such as data reduction, consumer behavior, and advertising.

== Biography ==
Ehrenberg was born in Germany in 1926 into a well-known academic family. His father was the theologian Hans Ehrenberg, and his uncle was the historian Victor Ehrenberg. The historians Geoffrey and Lewis Elton were his cousins. In 1938, he moved to England with his parents. He attended Queen's College, Taunton, and later studied statistics at Kings College, Newcastle, and the University of Cambridge.

In 1951, Ehrenberg became a lecturer in statistics at the Institute of Psychiatry in London. He moved into commercial marketing research and consulting in 1955, where his writings on statistical methodology in marketing research and wider fields soon became well known. In 1970, he was invited to take the Chair of Marketing and Communication at the London Business School, where he remained for 23 years, eventually taking up a Research Chair.

In 1993, Ehrenberg became Professor of Marketing at London South Bank University where he founded the Centre for Research in Marketing and established the Research and Development Initiative which was funded by international businesses to pursue and disseminate quantitative marketing knowledge. It became closely associated with the Marketing Science Centre at the University of South Australia. In 2004, Ehrenberg was succeeded as Director of the R. and D. I. by Professor Byron Sharp of the School of Marketing at UNISA. In 2005, Ehrenberg retired fully from the Initiative.

The Marketing Science Centre has now been expanded by the University of South Australia to form The Ehrenberg-Bass Institute for Marketing Science and the Centre for Research in Marketing at LSBU was renamed the Ehrenberg Centre for Research in Marketing in 2005, and Dr. Dag Bennett is now the director. The former R. and D. I. has been incorporated into both the above.

Ehrenberg held the rare distinction of having been awarded the Gold Medal of the British Market Research Society twice, first in 1969 and again in 1996. He also held the Honorary Fellowship of the Royal Statistical Society. In December 2005 he was awarded an Honorary Doctorate by the University of South Australia. In 2010, he received the Lifetime Achievement Award of the (American) Advertising Research Foundation.

Ehrenberg wrote six books and over 200 publications. He retired at the age of 80.

== Research methods ==
An early interest in social science applications of statistics had already begun to show through in Cambridge (such as extensive experiments into the reliability of trained taste-testers for quality assessments and into price subsidies in the food industry). Also developed were two early aversions, the first to multivariate techniques imposed on simple data, and the second to mathematics for its own sake in applied statistics.

Ehrenberg's belief that the methods of physical science are applicable to social science was expressed in an article in the hard science journal Nature. In it he asserted that even in a field dominated by people's impulses to buy, that of marketing, there are striking regularities.

The discovery and development of such lawlike relationships, was described in series of papers. The definitive statement of this position came later in another paper read to the Royal Statistical Society. The summary stated baldly:

A result can be regarded as routinely predictable when it has recurred consistently under a known range of different conditions. This depends on the previous analysis of many sets of data, drawn from different populations. There is no such basis of extensive experience when a prediction is derived from the analysis of only a single set of data. Yet that is what is mainly discussed in our statistical texts.

Ehrenberg always pointed out that very many models of very different functional form may be generated with almost identical goodness of fit. The selection of an appropriate model form to express a quantitative relationship is governed in his view by the need for:

1. Previous knowledge. This seems obvious but standard statistical modelling techniques seldom if ever start from any reference to any earlier model.
2. Simplicity. Models with many parameters cannot be tested in their variations by new data.
3. Adequate but not unnecessarily wide scope. Scope means the range of conditions in which the model has been found to apply. Empirical models are not of universal application. Decision on whether the scope is adequate depends on technical knowledge of the topic being modelled.
4. The absence of bias in predictions. Closeness of fit is secondary to this. Exceptions to the model may be noted.
5. A structural model, which remains meaningful under algebraic transformation. This rules out regression techniques – even simple regression produces two different equations.

The failure to use any technique of optimisation either in model form selection or parameter determination has however been widely criticised. Ehrenberg has answered these criticisms by pointing to the absence of published and widely used models generated by conventional techniques. Another criticism is that Ehrenberg's published models deal with relationships between the averages of groups, and thus ignore variability between individuals.

The ideas in this section were used in one of Ehrenberg's principal fields of work, the study of buyer behaviour.

== Buyer behaviour ==
In 1955, Ehrenberg moved into marketing research working on consumer panels. His first milestone paper was "The Pattern of Consumer Purchases" which showed the applicability of the negative binomial distribution to the numbers of purchases of a brand of consumer goods.

In the early 1980s, with Gerald Goodhardt and Chris Chatfield, he extended the NBD model to account for brand choices. The generalisation to the multi-brand case was put forward in "The Dirichlet: A Comprehensive Model of Buying behaviour" and was read to the Royal Statistical Society. Finally published in 1984 the NBD-Dirichlet model of brand choice successfully modelled the repeated category and brand purchases within a wide variety of markets. 'The Dirichlet', as it became known, accounts for a number of empirical generalisations, including Double Jeopardy, the Duplication of Purchase law, and Natural Monopoly. It has been shown to hold over different product categories, countries, time, and for both subscription and repertoire repeat-purchase markets. It has been described as one of the most famous empirical generalisations in marketing, along with the Bass model of diffusion of innovation. In an independent effort, Bemmaor, and Schmittlein, Bemmaor and Morrison reported the same model. They studied its statistical properties, and in particular as it reduces to the simple NBD model. They labelled the univariate model as the Beta Binomial/Negative Binomial Distribution (BB/NBD). The model has since been extensively applied under this name by both academics and practitioners. Ehrenberg's work in this field was summarised in the book "Repeat Buying".

Ehrenberg derived from these models of buyer behaviour a view on advertising for established brands. It mostly serves to publicise the advertised brand, but seldom seems to persuade.

Promotions have only a short-term effect, and do not affect a brand's subsequent sales or brand loyalty. The extra buyers during the promotion have been seen almost all to have bought it before the promotion rather than being the hoped for new buyers.

== Data reduction ==
This is another strand in Ehrenberg's work. In 1975, he first published Data Reduction. The book has been revised, reprinted and translated (Ehrenberg 1981). It maintains that much of the approach to research methods and prediction depends on finding patterns in data and this is much aided by its presentation in simple tables. Such tables also aid communication of results.

The basic ideas are very simple. They depend on the principles of how memory works: clear layout of simple tables, rounding of figures, placing figures to be compared in the same column and showing averages.

This work has had a major effect in on the way data are presented in academia, commerce but less in the British public sector. There the layout of the official British Monthly Digest of Statistics under Sir Harry Campion antedated Ehrenberg by many years, but set a pattern in many ways the same.

== Communication ==
Over more than fifty years, Ehrenberg conducted research aimed at identifying empirical regularities in marketing and consumer behavior, often using existing datasets. He also published extensively on research methodology and data presentation, emphasizing clear and simple writing. His publication frequently used tables and chart design to present data in straightforward and interpret-able manner.

Ehrenberg drafted and re-drafted, often to the exasperation of his collaborators. He was tireless in presenting and publicising his conclusions on both sides of the Atlantic, though recently to the present writer he observed that his own major failure was in effectively communicating his principles to the users of statistics. His work continues, though, to influence the practice of both statistical science and marketing.

== Bibliography ==
These include some important papers not specifically mentioned above.

- Chatfield C., Ehrenberg, A. and Goodhardt, G. (1966), Progress on a simplified model of stationary purchasing behaviour, Journal of the Royal Statistical Society A, 129, 317–367.
- Ehrenberg, A., (1955) Measurement and mathematics in psychology, British Journal of Psychology, 46, 20–29.
- Ehrenberg, A. S. C. (1962). Some questions about factor analysis. Journal of the Royal Statistical Society D, 12(3), 191–208. Based on "Factor Analysis in Market Research", published in 1959 as Research Paper No. 1 by the British Market Research Bureau Limited.
- Ehrenberg, A., (1964) Description, Prediction and Decision, Journal of the Market Research Society, 13, 14–33.
- Ehrenberg, A, Goodhardt, G. and Barwise, P (1990), Double jeopardy revisited, Journal of Marketing, 54, July, 82–91.
- Ehrenberg, A. Uncles, M, and Goodhardt, G. (2004), Understanding Brand Performance Measures: Using Dirichlet Benchmarks, Journal of Business Research, 57, 12, 1307–1325.
- Scriven, J.A and Ehrenberg, A.S.C. (2004), Consistent Consumer Responses to Price Changes, Australasian Marketing Journal, 12, 3.
