= Victor Ehrenberg (historian) =

German historian and classical scholar (1891–1976)

- Born: 22 November 1891; Altona, German Empire
- Died: 25 January 1976 (aged 84); London, England
- Occupation: Historian
- Spouse: Eva Dorothea Ehrenberg
- Children: Geoffrey Elton; Lewis Elton
- Relatives: Hans Ehrenberg (brother); Andrew S. C. Ehrenberg (nephew); Victor Ehrenberg (uncle); Richard Ehrenberg (uncle); Ben Elton (grandson)

Victor Ehrenberg (22 November 1891 – 25 January 1976) was a German-British Jewish historian.

== Life ==
Ehrenberg was born in Altona to a noted German Jewish family. He was the younger brother of Hans Ehrenberg and the nephew of the jurist Victor Ehrenberg, and a nephew of economist Richard Ehrenberg.

After four years of military service in World War I (communications), he resumed his studies in Tübingen, where he earned his doctorate in 1920 and completed his habilitation at the Goethe University Frankfurt in 1922.

In 1929, he was appointed to the chair of Ancient History at the Charles University in Prague. Shortly before the German troops invaded, Ehrenberg fled with his family to Great Britain in February 1939, where he held various teaching positions during World War II, including in Newcastle. In 1946, he accepted a professorship at the University of London, having declined a chair in Munich because he did not wish to return to Germany. From 1958, he was member of the Heidelberg Academy of Sciences and Humanities.

The focus of Ehrenberg's wide-ranging scholarly work was in the field of Greek history. His best-known book was titled The People of Aristophanes: A Sociology of Old Attic Comedy (German title: Aristophanes und das Volk von Athen) and dealt with the sociology of Old Attic comedy. He also wrote over 100 articles for the Pauly encyclopedias.

Ehrenberg was married to the teacher Eva Dorothea Ehrenberg, née Sommer (1891–1964), a daughter of Siegfried Sommer and Helene Sommer (High Court Judge, Hessen). He was the father of Geoffrey and Lewis Elton, grandfather of Ben Elton, and first cousin twice removed of Olivia Newton-John.

He died in London, aged 84. A bequest made in his will to the Institute of Classical Studies, University of London funds the Grote Prize, an academic prize for outstanding scholarship in the field of Ancient history.

== Works ==
- Ost und West. Studien zur geschichtlichen Problematik der Antike. Brno 1935.
- Alexander and the Greeks. Blackwell, Oxford 1938.
- The people of Aristophanes. Blackwell, Oxford 1943.
- Der Staat der Griechen. 2., expanded edition. Artemis, Zürich and Stuttgart 1965. (Translated into English as The Greek State, 2nd ed., Meuthen 1969)
- Polis und Imperium. Beiträge zur Alten Geschichte. Hrsg. v. K. F. Stroheker and A.J. Graham. Artemis, Zürich and Stuttgart 1965.
- From Solon to Socrates. Greek history and civilization during the sixth and fifth centuries B. C. Methuen, London 1968 and Nachdrucke, ISBN 0-415-04024-8
- Man, State and Deity: Essays in Ancient History. Methuen, London, 1974, ISBN 0-416-79610-9.
