= Ralph Elliott =

German-born Australian philologist, and runologist

Ralph Warren Victor Elliott, AM FAHA (born Rudolf W. H. V. Ehrenberg; 14 August 1921 – 24 June 2012) was a German-born Australian professor of English, and a runologist.

== Life and career ==
Elliott was born Rudolf W. H. V. Ehrenberg in Berlin, Germany, on 14 August 1921, the son of Margarete (Landecker) and Kurt Phillip Rudolf Ehrenberg, an architect. Rudolf's father was of half Jewish and half German Lutheran background, and his mother was Jewish. His paternal grandfather was the distinguished jurist Victor Gabriel Ehrenberg and his paternal grandmother was the daughter of Rudolf von Jhering. Through his father, Elliott was a first cousin, once removed, of singer Olivia Newton-John. The family moved to Karlsruhe in 1931, and Rudolf attended the Bismarck-Gymnasium Karlsruhe between the ages of ten and sixteen. Because of the dangers that his family were facing under the Nazi regime, Kurt Ehrenberg decided it was best for his family to leave Germany. His eldest daughter married and emigrated to the United States. Rudolf and his younger sister, Lena, were sent to live with their uncle, the Nobel Prize-winning physicist Max Born, in Edinburgh. Rudolf's parents managed to escape to Britain two weeks before the outbreak of the Second World War.

Rudolf Ehrenberg enrolled at the University of St Andrews in 1939, where he gained a medallion for General English in 1940. Later the same year he was interned and sent to an internment camp in the Isle of Man and then in Canada, only to be allowed to return to Britain ten months later to join an Alien Pioneer Company. Rudolf Ehrenberg changed his name to Ralph Warren Victor Elliott on 12 May 1943. After officer training at Sandhurst he was awarded the Sword of Honour (actually a medallion because of wartime shortages). With the rank of lieutenant, he was posted to the Leicestershire Regiment, and then to the Manchester Regiment in April 1945. He was severely wounded in combat in the Teutoburg Forest, and nearly died before being rescued several hours later.

After the end of the war, Elliott resumed his studies at St Andrews, where he graduated in 1949. He taught at St Andrews for a while, before moving to the newly created University College of North Staffordshire, where he wrote an influential introduction to the runic script that was published in 1959.

He had two children (Naomi and Oliver) with his first wife in the United Kingdom. Later he remarried and had two more children (Hillary and Francis).

He emigrated to Australia in 1959, with his family (his second wife, Margaret Robinson, and children including Naomi, Hilary, and Francis) and his father, where he took up a post teaching Old English and Middle English at the University of Adelaide, rising to the position of professor. He was appointed as Foundation Professor of English at Flinders University in Adelaide in 1964. He later accepted the position of Master of University House at the Australian National University in Canberra, where he remained until retirement. During this time he published books on Chaucer's English (1974) and Thomas Hardy's English (1984). He contributed greatly to the university's and to Canberra's cultural life, such as by helping launch the National Word Festival, and generously tutoring students. He was a regular reviewer for the Canberra Times for ten years and hosted a talkback radio session on ABC 666. He loved books and reading, and "donated signed book collections both to the ANU Library and University House".

He died in Canberra on 24 June 2012.

== Sir Gawain and the Green Knight ==
Elliott also published a book of collected essays on Sir Gawain and the Green Knight, a topic that had interested him since his time in north Staffordshire a quarter of a century earlier, when he wrote the newspaper article "Sir Gawain in Staffordshire: A Detective Essay in Literary Geography" that appeared in The Times newspaper on 21 May 1958. His later combination of careful place-name studies and fieldwork firmly established the graphic hunting locations of Sir Gawain as the hunting territory controlled in medieval times by monks at what is now Swythamley Park. He further claimed the location of the 'Green Chapel', which the knight Sir Gawain is taken to near the end of the tale, as being near ("two myle henne" v1078) to the old manor house at Swythamley Park at the bottom of a valley ("bothm of the brem valay" v2145) on a hillside ("loke a littel on the launde, on thi lyfte honde" v2147) in a large fissure ("an olde caue,/or a creuisse of an olde cragge" v2182–83). His work on the Green Knight and its story-locations also produced many essays on the relevant dialect and distinctive landscape topography of the moorlands of North Staffordshire, and scholars now accept that the Staffordshire Moorlands are both the linguistic and the topographic location of many scenes, even if the exact location of the Green Chapel itself remains contentious (the leading rival is near Wetton Mill, some eight miles SE). Most of his essays on the topic are collected in his The Gawain Country: Essays on the Topography of Middle English Alliterative Poetry (University of Leeds, 1984), but the book was later supplemented by the separate essay "Holes and Caves in the Gawain Country" (1988). A summary of his work in Sir Gawain is today most easily accessible on Derek Brewer (Ed.), A Companion to the Gawain-poet, Boydell & Brewer, 1999.

== Honours ==
Elliott was a Foundation Fellow of the Australian Academy of the Humanities (1969).

In 1990 he was made a Member of the Order of Australia in recognition of "service to the community and to education". In 2001 he was awarded the Centenary Medal for "service to Australian society and the humanities in the history of the English language". In 2005 he published a short autobiography entitled One Life, Two Languages.

== Works ==
- 1959. Runes: an Introduction. Manchester: Manchester University Press. 2nd edition, 1989. ISBN 978-0-7190-0787-3
- 1974. Chaucer's English. London: Deutsch. ISBN 0-233-96539-4
- 1984. Thomas Hardy's English. Oxford: Blackwell. ISBN 0-631-13659-2
- 1984. The Gawain Country: Essays on the Topography of Middle English Alliterative Poetry. Leeds Texts and Monographs Leeds Texts and Monographs New Series no. 8. Leeds: University of Leeds.
- 1996. "The Runic Script" in P. T. Daniels and W. Bright, eds., The World's Writing Systems, 332–339. New York: Oxford University Press.
- 1997. "Landscape and Geography" in D. Brewer and J. Gibson, eds., A Companion to the Gawain Poet, 105–117. Cambridge: D.S. Brewer.
- 2002. "Sir Gawain and the Wallabies: A Mystery in Seven Scenes" in L. Rasmussen, V. Spear and D. Tillotson eds., Our Medieval Heritage. Essays in Honour of John Tillotson for his 60th Birthday, 157–163. Cardiff: Merton Priory Press.
- 2005. "One Life, Two Languages" in A. Oizumi and T. Kubouchi, eds., Medieval English Language Scholarship. Autobiographies by Representative Scholars in Our Discipline, 30–47. Hildesheim and New York: Olms.
- 2010. "Chaucer's Landscapes and other essays: a selection of essays, speeches and reviews written between 1951 and 2008, with a memoir", ed., J.K. Lloyd Jones, Melbourne: Australian Scholarly Publishing. ISBN 9781921509452
