= Geoffrey Elton =

German–British historian (1921–1994)

Sir Geoffrey Elton FBA
- Born: Gottfried Rudolf Otto Ehrenberg; 17 August 1921; Tübingen, Weimar Germany
- Died: 4 December 1994 (aged 73); Cambridge, Cambridgeshire, England
- Occupation: Historian
- Spouse: Sheila Lambert (m. 1952)
- Father: Victor Ehrenberg
- Relatives: Lewis Elton (brother); Ben Elton (nephew); Hans Ehrenberg (uncle); Andrew S. C. Ehrenberg (cousin); Victor Ehrenberg (great-uncle); Richard Ehrenberg (great-uncle)

Academic background
- Education: University College London

Academic work
- Institutions: University of Glasgow; University of Cambridge
- Notable students: Michael Walzer

Sir Geoffrey Rudolph Elton (born Gottfried Rudolf Otto Ehrenberg; 17 August 1921 – 4 December 1994) was a German-born British political and constitutional historian, specialising in the Tudor period. He taught at Clare College, Cambridge, and was the Regius Professor of Modern History there from 1983 to 1988.

== Early life ==
Ehrenberg was born in Tübingen, Germany. His parents were the Jewish scholars Victor Ehrenberg and Eva Dorothea Sommer. In 1929, the Ehrenbergs moved to Prague, Czechoslovakia. In February 1939, the Ehrenbergs fled to Britain. Ehrenberg continued his education at Rydal School, a Methodist school in Wales, starting in 1939. After only two years, Ehrenberg was working as a teacher at Rydal and achieved the position of assistant master in mathematics, history and German.

There, he took courses via correspondence at the University of London and graduated with a degree in Ancient History in 1943. Ehrenberg enlisted in the British Army in 1943. He spent his time in the Army in the Intelligence Corps and the East Surrey Regiment, serving with the Eighth Army in Italy from 1944 to 1946 and reaching the rank of sergeant. During this period, Ehrenberg anglicised his name to Geoffrey Rudolph Elton. After his discharge from the army, Elton studied early modern history at University College London, graduating with a PhD in 1949.

Under the supervision of J. E. Neale, Elton was awarded a PhD for his thesis "Thomas Cromwell, Aspects of his Administrative Work", in which he first developed the ideas that he was to pursue for the rest of his life. He naturalised as a British subject in September 1947.

== Career ==
Elton taught at the University of Glasgow and from 1949 onwards at Clare College, Cambridge, and was the Regius Professor of Modern History there from 1983 to 1988. Pupils included John Guy, Diarmaid MacCulloch, Susan Brigden and David Starkey. He worked as publication secretary of the British Academy from 1981 to 1990 and served as the president of the Royal Historical Society from 1972 to 1976. He was appointed a Knight Bachelor in the 1986 New Year Honours.

=== The Tudor Revolution in Government ===
Elton focused primarily on the life of Henry VIII but also made significant contributions to the study of Elizabeth I. Elton was most famous for arguing in his 1953 book The Tudor Revolution in Government that Thomas Cromwell was the author of modern, bureaucratic government, which replaced medieval, household-based government. Until the 1950s, historians had played down Cromwell's role by calling him a doctrinaire hack who was little more than the agent of the despotic Henry VIII. Elton, however, made Cromwell the central figure in the Tudor revolution in government. Elton portrayed Cromwell as the presiding genius, much more so than the King, in handling the break with Rome and the laws and administrative procedures that made the English Reformation so important. Elton wrote that Cromwell was responsible for translating royal supremacy into parliamentary terms by creating powerful new organs of government to take charge of church lands and thoroughly removing the medieval features of the central government.

That change took place in the 1530s and must be regarded as part of a planned revolution. In essence, Elton was arguing that before Cromwell, the realm could be viewed as the King's private estate writ large and that most administration was done by the King's household servants rather than by separate state offices. Cromwell, Henry's chief minister from 1532 to 1540, introduced reforms into the administration that delineated the King's household from the state and created a modern bureaucratic government. Cromwell shone Tudor light into the darker corners of the Realm and radically altered the role of Parliament and the competence of Statute. Elton argued that by masterminding such reforms, Cromwell laid the foundations of England's future stability and success.

== Influence ==
Elton elaborated on his ideas in his 1955 work, the bestselling England under the Tudors, which went through three editions, and his Wiles Lectures, which he published in 1973 as Reform and Renewal: Thomas Cromwell and the Common Weal.

His thesis has been widely challenged by younger Tudor historians and can no longer be regarded as an orthodoxy, but his contribution to the debate has profoundly influenced subsequent discussion of Tudor government, particularly on the role of Cromwell.

=== Historical perspective ===
Elton was a staunch admirer of Margaret Thatcher and Winston Churchill. He was also a fierce critic of Marxist historians, who he argued were presenting seriously flawed interpretations of the past. In particular, Elton was opposed to the idea that the English Civil War was caused by socioeconomic changes in the 16th and 17th centuries, arguing instead that it was largely due to the incompetence of the Stuart kings. Elton was also famous for his role in the Carr–Elton debate when he defended the nineteenth-century interpretation of empirical, 'scientific' history most famously associated with Leopold von Ranke against E. H. Carr's views. Elton wrote his 1967 book The Practice of History largely in response to Carr's 1961 book What is History?.

Elton was a strong defender of the traditional methods of history and was appalled by postmodernism, saying, for example, that "we are fighting for the lives of innocent young people beset by devilish tempters who claim to offer higher forms of thought and deeper truths and insights – the intellectual equivalent of crack, in fact. Any acceptance of these theories – even the most gentle or modest bow in their direction – can prove fatal." Ex-pupils of his, such as John Guy claim he did embody a "revisionist streak," reflected both in his work on Cromwell, his attack on John Neale's traditionalist account of Elizabeth I's parliaments, and in his support for a more contingent and political set of causes for the English Civil War of the mid-seventeenth century.

In 1990, Elton was one of the leading historians behind the setting up of the History Curriculum Association. The Association advocated a more knowledge-based history curriculum in schools. It expressed "profound disquiet" at the way history was being taught in the classroom and observed that the integrity of history was threatened.

Elton saw the duty of historians as empirically gathering evidence and objectively analysing what the evidence has to say. As a traditionalist, he placed great emphasis on the role of individuals in history instead of abstract, impersonal forces. For instance, his 1963 book Reformation Europe is in large part concerned with the duel between Martin Luther and the Holy Roman Emperor Charles V. Elton objected to cross-disciplinary efforts such as efforts to combine history with anthropology or sociology. He saw political history as the best and most important kind of history.

== Family ==
Elton was the brother of the education researcher Lewis Elton and the uncle of Lewis's son, the comedian and writer Ben Elton. He married a fellow historian, Sheila Lambert, in 1952. Elton died of a heart attack at his home in Cambridge on 4 December 1994.

== Works ==
He edited the second edition of the influential collection The Tudor Constitution. In it, he supported John Aylmer's basic conclusion that the Tudor constitution mirrored that of the mixed constitution of Sparta.

- The Tudor Revolution in Government: Administrative Changes in the Reign of Henry VIII, Cambridge University Press, 1953.
- England Under The Tudors, London: Methuen, 1955, revised edition 1974, third edition 1991.
- ed. The New Cambridge Modern History: Volume 2, The Reformation, 1520-1559, Cambridge: Cambridge University Press, 1958; 2nd ed. 1990; excerpt
- Star Chamber Stories, London: Methuen, 1958.
- The Tudor Constitution: Documents and Commentary, Cambridge University Press, 1960; second edition, 1982.
- Henry VIII; An essay In Revision, London: Historical Association by Routledge & K. Paul, 1962.
- Reformation Europe, 1517-1559, New York: Harper & Row, 1963.
- The Practice of History, London: Fontana Press, 1967.
- Renaissance and Reformation, 1300–1640, edited by G.R. Elton, New York: Macmillan, 1968.
- The Body of the Whole Realm; Parliament and Representation in Medieval and Tudor England, Charlottesville: University Press of Virginia, 1969.
- England, 1200–1640, Ithaca: Cornell University Press, 1969.
- Modern Historians on British History 1485-1945: A Critical Bibliography 1945-1969 (Methuen, 1969), annotated guide to 1000 history books on every major topic, plus book reviews and major scholarly articles. online
- Political History: Principles and Practice, London: Penguin Press/New York: Basic Books, 1970.
- Reform and Renewal: Thomas Cromwell and the Common Weal, Cambridge: Cambridge University Press, 1973; ISBN 0-521-09809-2.
- Policy and Police: the Enforcement of the Reformation in the Age of Thomas Cromwell, Cambridge University Press, 1973.
- Studies in Tudor and Stuart Politics and Government: Papers and Reviews, 1945–1972, 4 volumes, Cambridge University Press, 1974–1992.
- Annual bibliography of British and Irish history, Brighton, Sussex [England]:Harvester Press/Atlantic Highlands, N.J.: Humanities Press for the Royal Historical Society, 1976.
- Reform and Reformation: England 1509–1558, London: Arnold, 1977; 1979 ISBN 9780674752481.
- English Law In The Sixteenth Century: Reform In An Age of Change, London: Selden Society, 1979.
- (co-written with Robert Fogel) Which Road to the Past? Two Views of History, New Haven, CT: Yale University Press, 1983 ISBN 9780300030112
- F.W. Maitland, London: Weidenfeld and Nicolson, 1985; Yale University Press. ISBN 9780297786146
- The Parliament of England, 1559–1581, Cambridge University Press, 1986. ISBN 9780521328357
- Return to Essentials: Some Reflections on the Present State of Historical Study, Cambridge University Press, 1991.
- Thomas Cromwell, Headstart History Papers (ed. Judith Loades), Ipswich, 1991.
- The English, Oxford: Blackwell, 1992; 1994 ISBN 9780631196068

== See also ==
- A History of England

== Notes ==
Academic offices
Preceded by Richard Southern	President of the Royal Historical Society; 1973–1977	Succeeded by John Habakkuk
Preceded by Owen Chadwick	Regius Professor of Modern History at the University of Cambridge; 1983–1988	Succeeded by Patrick Collinson
