= Karl Larenz =

German jurist (1903–1993)

Karl Larenz (23 April 1903, Wesel − 24 January 1993, Olching) was a German jurist and philosopher of law. He is known for his influential contributions to German civil law, as well as for being one of the leading Nazi legal theorists in the domain of civil law.

== Biography ==
After a childhood in Posen, and studies at the Friedrich Wilhelm University of Berlin as well as at Marburg University, the Ludwig-Maximilians-Universität München, and the University of Göttingen, Larenz obtained a doctorate in law in 1926 with a dissertation on Hegel, and a habilitation in 1929 at the University of Göttingen. From 1933 on, he taught law at Kiel University. In essays such as Rechtsperson und subjektives Recht (1935), he sought to legitimize the racist ideology of the Nazi regime with high-minded Hegelian rhetoric. In 1937, he joined the Nazi Party, and participated in several of its academic endeavours.

After World War II, Larenz was forbidden to teach until 1949 due to his involvement with the regime. Subsequently, he taught law at Kiel University and since 1960 at the Ludwig-Maximilians-Universität München. He wrote influential textbooks on civil law (including Lehrbuch des Schuldrechts, 1953), as well on legal methodology (Methodenlehre der Rechtswissenschaft, 1960), which remained in print until the 21st century.
