= Carl Ehrenberg =

German composer

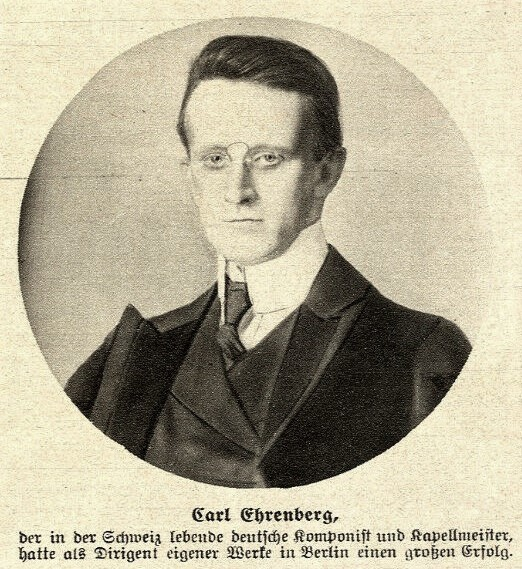
Carl Ehrenberg 1913

Carl Emil Theodor Ehrenberg (5 April 1878 – 26 February 1962) was a German composer.

The brother of the violinist and painter Paul Ehrenberg, Carl Ehrenberg was born in Dresden and studied at the Dresden Conservatory under Felix Draeseke. He later worked as a Kapellmeister in Dortmund, Würzburg, Poznań, Augsburg, Metz, and Lausanne, before becoming the Kapellmeister of the Berlin State Opera in 1922. Between 1925 and 1935, he taught at the Musikhochschule Köln, and after 1945, at the Musikhochschule München. He died in Munich.

Ehrenberg composed one opera, two symphonies, symphonic sketches, two orchestral suites, one overture, pieces for male choir with orchestra, one cello concerto, chamber music, theater music, and lieder.
