= Rudolf von Jhering =

German jurist (1818–1892)

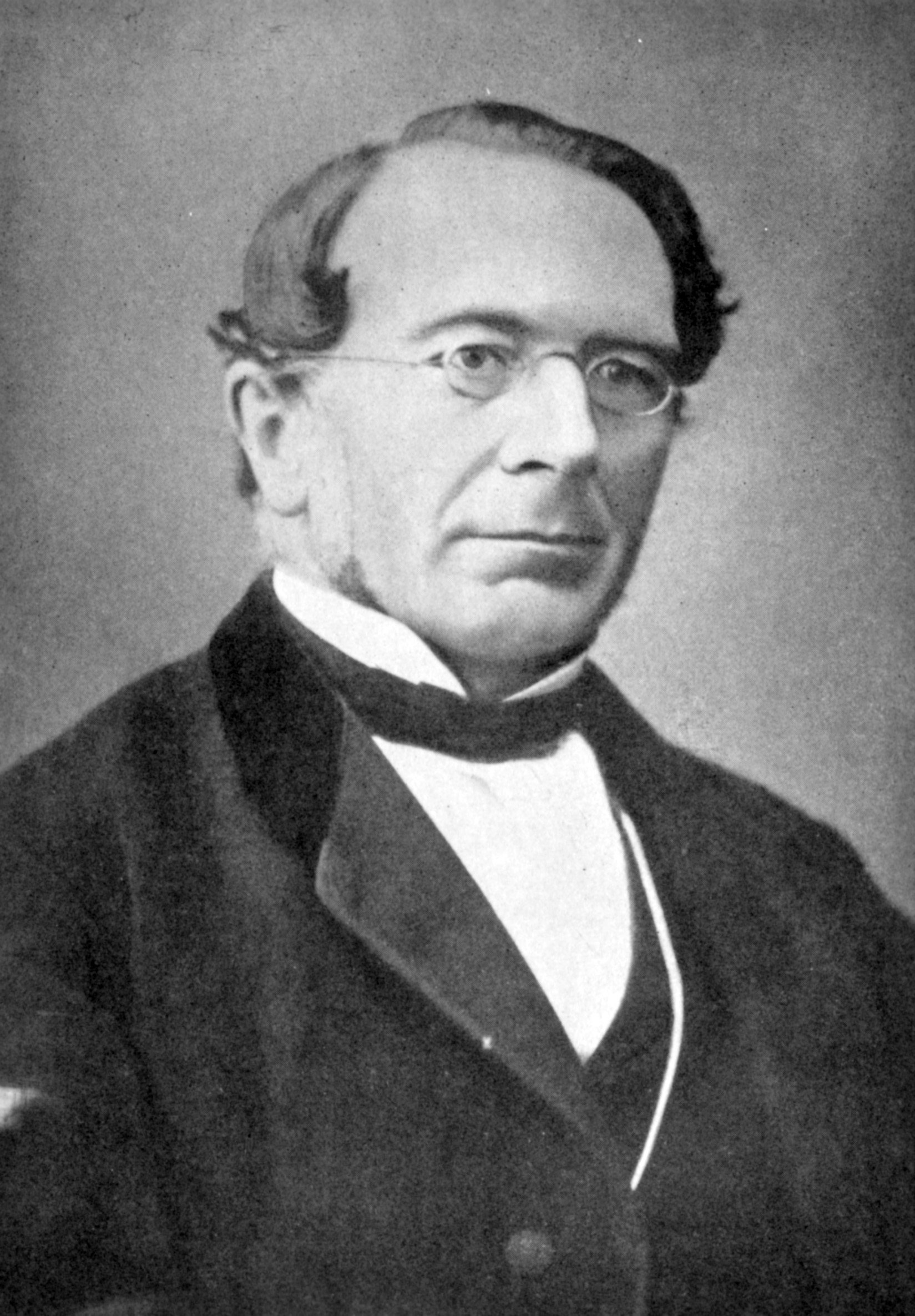
- Born: Caspar Rudolf Jhering; 22 August 1818; Aurich, Kingdom of Hanover, German Confederation
- Died: 17 September 1892 (aged 74); Göttingen, Province of Hanover, Kingdom of Prussia, German Empire
- Other name: Caspar Rudolph von Jhering (from 1872)
- Spouse: Ida Christina Frölich

Philosophical work
- Era: 19th-century philosophy
- Region: Western philosophy
- School: German historical school
- Main interests: Philosophy of law
- Notable ideas: Jurisprudence of concepts, jurisprudence of interests

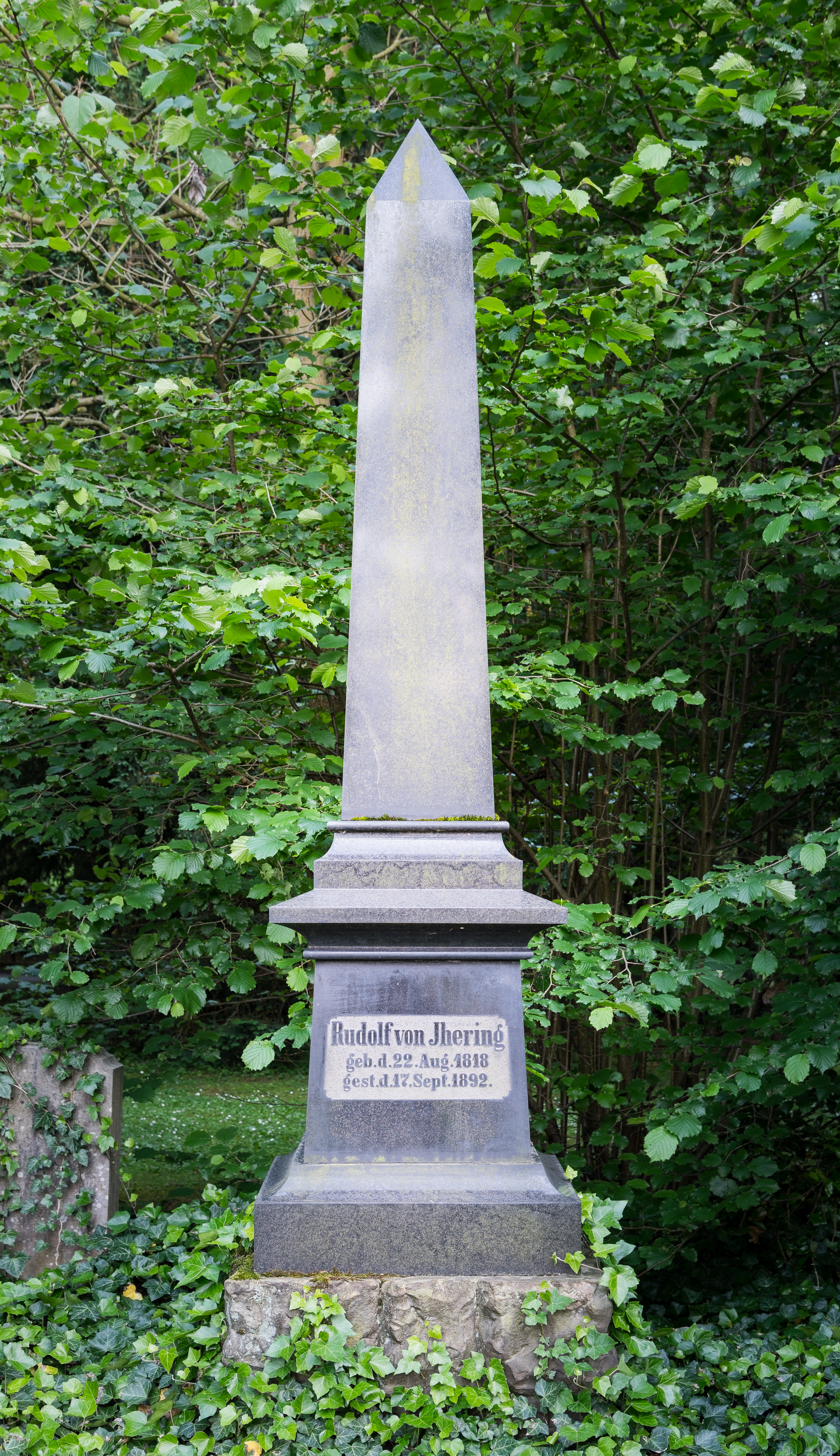
Grave of Rudolf von Jhering in Göttingen, Germany

Caspar Rudolph von Jhering (German: [ˈjeːrɪŋ]; also Ihering; 22 August 1818 – 17 September 1892) was a German jurist. He is best known for his 1872 book Der Kampf ums Recht (The Struggle for Law), as a legal scholar, and as the founder of a modern sociological and historical school of law. His ideas were important to the subsequent development of the "jurisprudence of interests" in Germany.

== Life and career ==
Jhering was born on 22 August 1818 in Aurich, the Kingdom of Hanover. He entered Heidelberg University in 1836 and also studied at the University of Göttingen, the Ludwig-Maximilians-Universität München, and starting 1838 at the Friedrich Wilhelm University of Berlin, where he obtained his PhD. Of all his teachers, Georg Friedrich Puchta was the most influential one to him.

In 1844, after graduating as a doctor juris, Jhering established himself in Berlin as Privatdozent for Roman law, and delivered public lectures on the Geist des römischen Rechts (Spirit of Roman law), the theme that may be said to have constituted his life's work. In 1845, he became an ordinary professor at the University of Basel, in 1846 at the University of Rostock, in 1849 at Kiel University, and in 1851 at the University of Giessen. He left his mark at each of those seats of learning; beyond any other of his contemporaries he animated the dry bones of Roman law.

In that period, the German juristic world was still under the dominating influence of Savigny. The older school looked askance at the young professor, who attempted to build up a system of jurisprudence based on natural justice. This is the keynote of his famous work, Geist des römischen Rechts auf den verschiedenen Stufen seiner Entwicklung (The spirit of Roman law at the various stages of its development, 1852–1865). Its originality and lucidity placed its author in the forefront of modern Roman jurists.

In the second half of the 19th century, Jhering's reputation was as high as that of Savigny's in the first half. Their methods were almost diametrically opposed. Savigny and his school represented a historical approach. Jhering's conception of jurisprudence was as a science to be utilized for the further advancement of the moral and social interests of mankind.

In 1868, Jhering accepted the chair of Roman Law at the University of Vienna, where his lecture-room was not only crowded with regular students but also men of all professions and even high-ranking officials. In 1872 Emperor Franz Joseph I of Austria conferred a title of hereditary nobility upon him.

The social functions of the Austrian metropolis became wearisome, and Jhering gladly exchanged it for the repose of Göttingen, where he became professor in 1872. That year, he had read a lecture in Vienna before an admiring audience, published under the title of Der Kampf um's Recht (1872; Eng. trans., The Struggle for Law, 1879). Its success was extraordinary. Within two years it attained twelve editions, and it has been translated into 26 languages. In this, his most famous work, Jhering based his theory of duty in the maintenance of one's rights, firstly, on the connection between rights and personality; and secondly, on the solidarity of law and rights. The relationship of rights to personality is explored. Our rights involve a parcel of our social worth, our honor. Whoever violates our rights, attacks our worth, our honor.

This work was followed five years later by Der Zweck im Recht (The Purpose in Law, 2 volumes, 1877–1883). These two works reflect Jhering's individuality. The Kampf ums Recht shows the firmness of his character, the strength of his sense of justice, and his juristic method and logic: every responsible person owes a duty to himself to assert his rights. The Zweck im Recht evidences the bent of the author's intellect. But perhaps the happiest combination of all his distinctive characteristics is to be found in his Jurisprudenz des täglichen Lebens (1870; Eng. trans., 1904). A great feature of his lectures was his so-called Praktika, problems in Roman law, and a collection of these with hints for solution was published as early as 1847 under the title Civilrechtsfalle ohne Entscheidungen.

Aside from shorter positions at Leipzig University and Heidelberg University, Jhering continued to work at the University of Göttingen until his death on 17 September 1892.

His other works include the following: Beiträge zur Lehre vom Besitz, first published in the Jahrbücher für die Dogmatik des heutigen römischen und deutschen Privatrechts, and then separately; Der Besitzwille, and an article entitled Besitz in the Handwörterbuch der Staatswissenschaften (1891), which aroused much controversy at the time, particularly on account of the opposition manifested to Savigny's conception of the subject.

Jhering was married to Ida Christina Frölich. His oldest son was the German-Brazilian zoologist Hermann von Ihering (1850–1930). He was also the great-great-grandfather of Australian singer and actress Olivia Newton-John through his daughter Helene Ehrenberg and her marriage to the German jurist Victor Ehrenberg.

Jhering was elected a foreign member of the Royal Netherlands Academy of Arts and Sciences in 1874.

See also Scherz und Ernst in der Jurisprudenz (1885); Das Schuldmoment im römischen Privatrecht (1867); Das Trinkgeld (1882); and among the papers he left behind him his Vorgeschichte der Indoeuropaer, a fragment, was published by Victor Ehrenberg in 1894.

In October 2018, the bicentenary of Jhering was commemorated by scholars of Roman law from several countries.

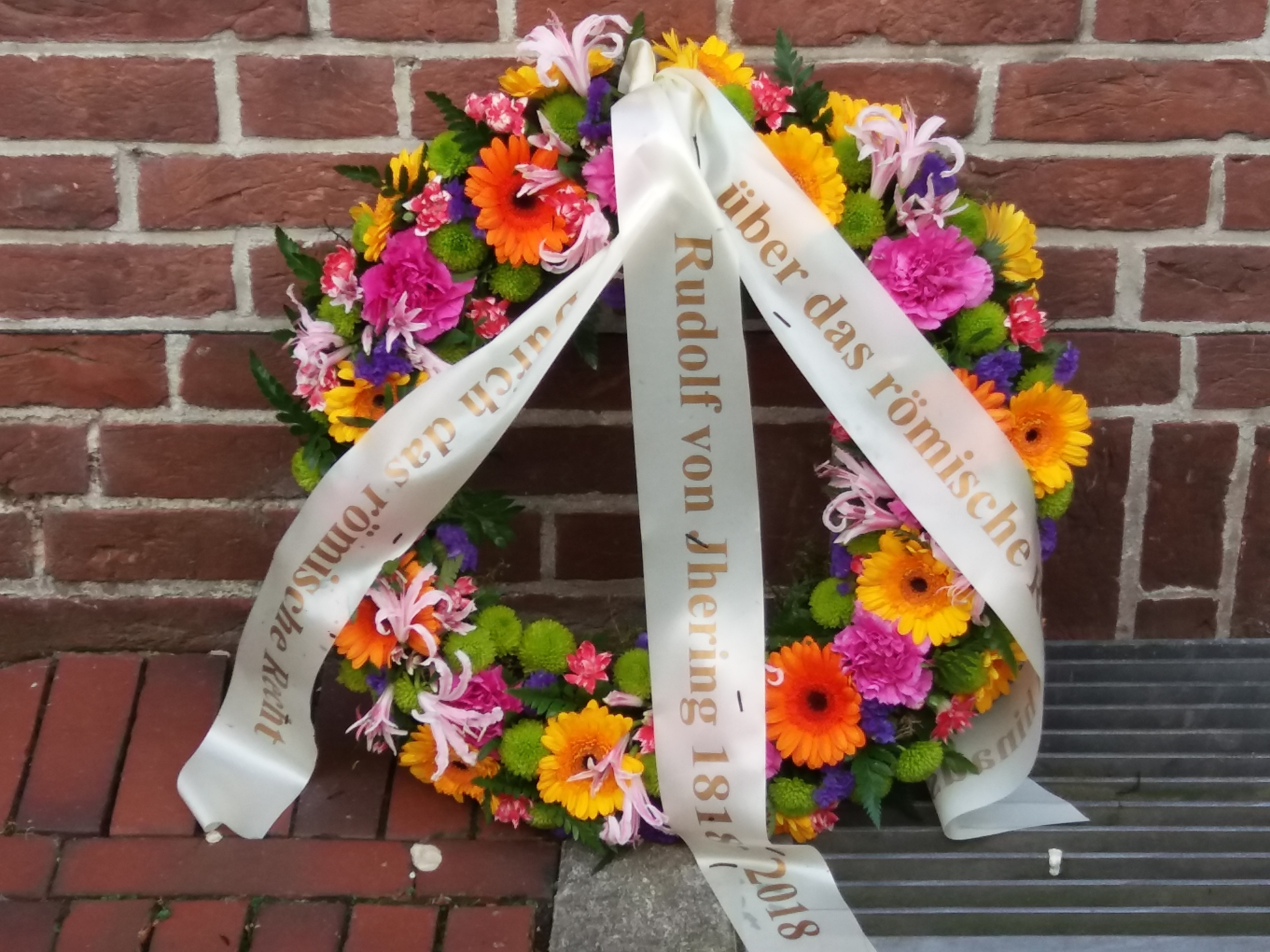
Flowers to commemorate Rudolf von Jhering 1818-2018

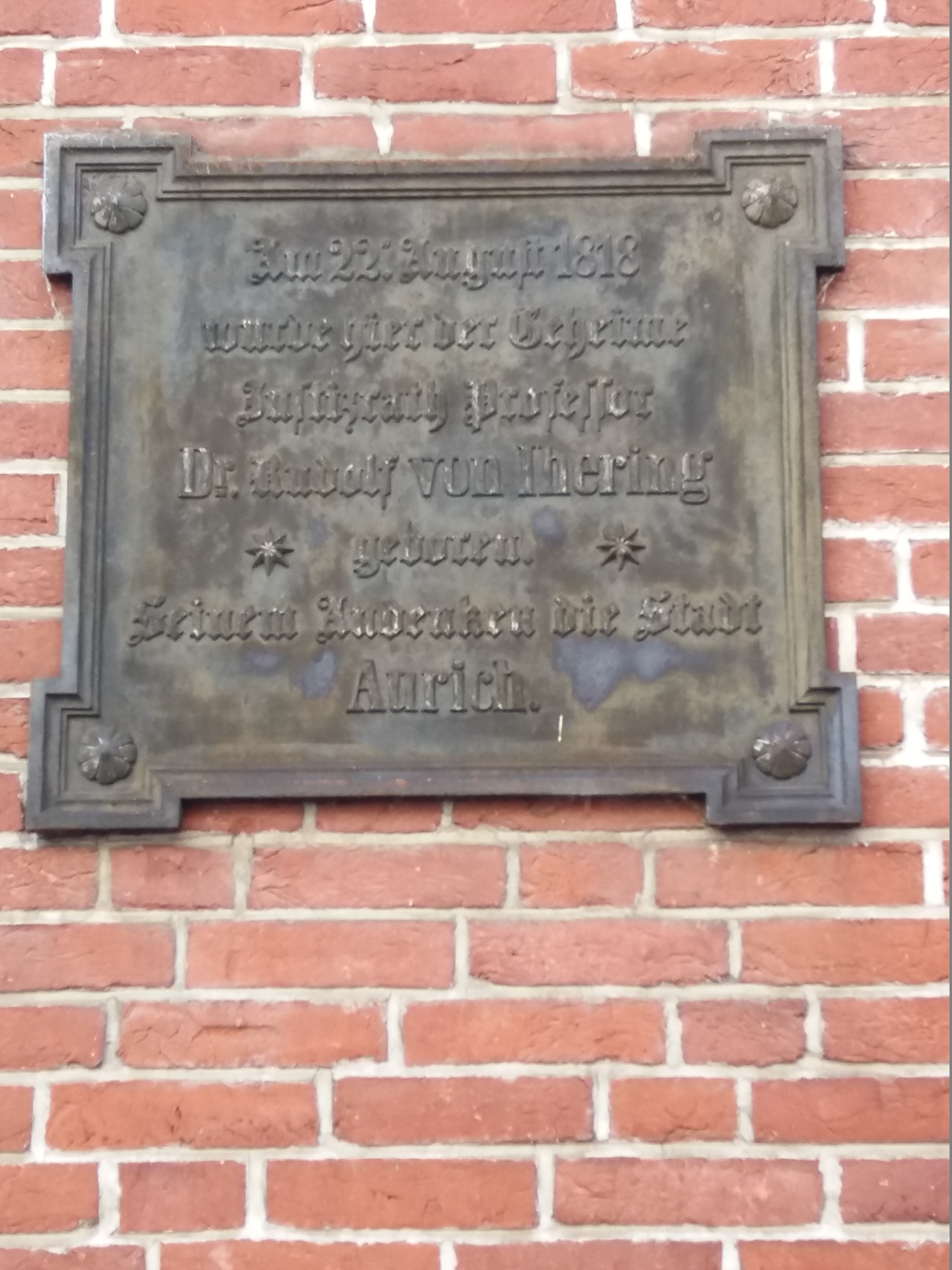
Plaquette at the birthplace of Jhering in Aurich, Germany

== Selected works ==
A bibliography of Jhering is provided by Tasia Walter. His main works include:

- Jhering, Rudolf von (1844). Abhandlungen aus dem römischen Recht (in German). Leipzig: Breitkopf und Härtel.
- Jhering, Rudolf von (1847). Civilrechtsfälle ohne Entscheidungen (in German). Leipzig: Breitkopf und Härtel.
- Jhering, Rudolf von (1852). Geist des römischen Rechts auf den verschiedenen Stufen seiner Entwicklung (in German). Vol. I. Leipzig: Breitkopf und Härtel.
- Jhering, Rudolf von (1854). Geist des römischen Rechts auf den verschiedenen Stufen seiner Entwicklung (in German). Vol. II-1. Leipzig: Breitkopf und Härtel.
- Jhering, Rudolf von (1858). Geist des römischen Rechts auf den verschiedenen Stufen seiner Entwicklung (in German). Vol. II-2. Leipzig: Breitkopf und Härtel.
- Jhering, Rudolf von (1865). Geist des römischen Rechts auf den verschiedenen Stufen seiner Entwicklung (in German). Vol. III-1. Leipzig: Breitkopf und Härtel.
- Jhering, Rudolf von (1872). Der Kampf um's Recht (in German). Wien: Manz'sche Buchhandlung.
  - Jhering, Rudolf von (1915). The Struggle for Law. Translated by Lalor, John Joseph (2nd ed.). Chicago: Callaghan & Company.
- Jhering, Rudolf von (1873). Die Jurisprudenz des täglichen Lebens (in German). Jena: Mauke.
  - Jhering, Rudolf von (1904). Law in Daily Life. Translated by Goudy, Henry. Oxford: Clarendon Press.
- Jhering, Rudolf von (1877). Der Zweck im Recht (in German). Vol. I. Leipzig: Breitkopf und Härtel.
  - Jhering, Rudolf von (1913). Law as a Means to an End (PDF). Vol. I. Translated by Husik, Isaac. Boston: The Boston Book Company. Archived from the original (PDF) on 10 June 2011.
- Jhering, Rudolf von (1883). Der Zweck im Recht (in German). Vol. II. Leipzig: Breitkopf und Härtel.
- Jhering, Rudolf von (1884). Scherz und Ernst in der Jurisprudenz (in German). Leipzig: Breitkopf und Härtel.
- Jhering, Rudolf von (1889). Der Besitzwille (in German). Jena: Gustav Fischer.
- Jhering, Rudolf von (1894). Ehrenberg, Victor (ed.). Vorgeschichte der Indoeuropäer (in German). Leipzig: Breitkopf und Härtel & Duncker und Humblot.
  - Jhering, Rudolf von (1897). The Evolution of the Aryan. Translated by Drucker, Adolphus. New York: Henry Holt and Company.

== See also ==
- Victor Ehrenberg (jurist)
- Culpa in contrahendo

== Bibliography ==
- Seagle, William (1945). "Rudolf von Jhering: Or Law as a Means to an End". University of Chicago Law Review. 13 (1): 71–89. doi:10.2307/1597562. ISSN 0041-9494. JSTOR 1597562.
