= Richard Ehrenberg =

German economist

Richard Ehrenberg (5 February 1857 – 17 December 1921) was a German economist.

He taught at Rostock University from 1899 to 1921.

== Literary works ==
- Hamburg und Antwerpen seit 300 Jahren, 1889
- Hamburg und England im Zeitalter der Königin Elisabeth, 1896
- Das Zeitalter der Fugger, 2 Vols., 1896, -- an English translation is also available: Richard Ehrenberg, Capital & Finance in the Age of the Renaissance: A Study of the Fuggers and Their Connections, 1928, reprinted 1985
- Das Familie in ihrer Bedeutung für das Volksleben, 1916
