= Paul Lee (environmentalist) =

American philosopher and environmentalist (1931–2022)

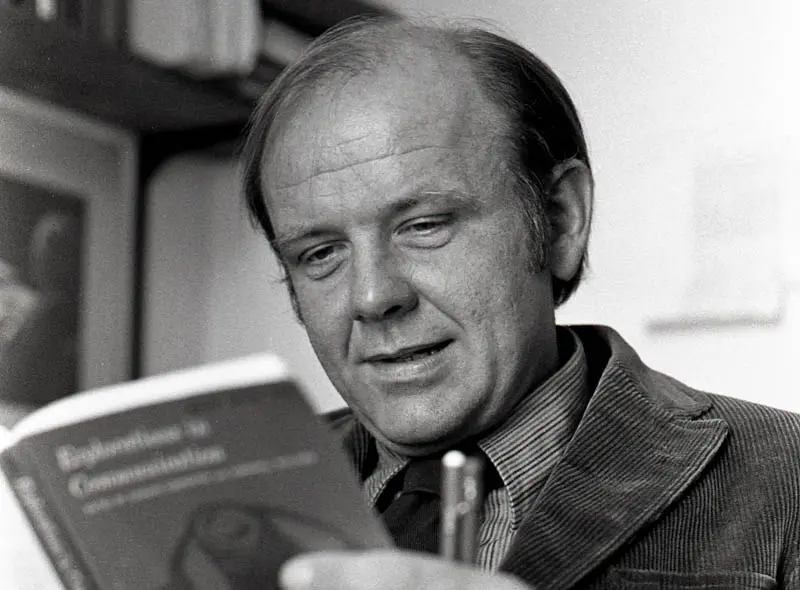
- Born: September 20, 1931; La Veta, Colorado, U.S.
- Died: October 20, 2022 (aged 91); Santa Cruz, California, U.S.
- Spouse: Charlene Lee

Education
- Education: Harvard Divinity School

Philosophical work
- Institutions: Harvard Divinity School, Massachusetts Institute of Technology, University of California, Santa Cruz
- Main interests: Christian existentialism; environmentalism; homelessness
- Website: ecotopialee.com

Paul Lee (September 20, 1931 – October 20, 2022) was an American philosopher who was a professor of existential and religious philosophy living in Santa Cruz, California. He was chair of the Romero Institute (formerly the Christic Institute). While an assistant professor of Humanities at MIT in the 1960s, Lee was a founding editor of the infamous Psychedelic Review, started by Timothy Leary and Richard Alpert (Ram Dass) at Harvard.

== Early life and education ==
Paul Lee was born in La Veta, Colorado on September 20, 1931, where his father practiced medicine. Eventually his family moved to Milwaukee, Wisconsin, where his father practiced medicine for 50 years before his retirement. In Milwaukee, Lee attended Custer High School.

Next, Lee attended St. Olaf College in Northfield, Minnesota where he studied philosophy under Howard Hong, the noted translator of Danish philosopher Søren Kierkegaard.

Lee then attended Luther Theological Seminary with the intention of following a career in ministry. However, jaundiced by what he perceived was the stale orthodoxy of the seminary, he attended the University of Minnesota and worked on a master's degree in philosophy. During one of his summers while pursuing his MA, he became enamored with theologian Paul Tillich after attending three of his lectures on existentialism at Union Theological Seminary in New York. Lee decided to transfer to Harvard Divinity School for his third year and graduated with a bachelor's degree in sacred theology (STB). Under the mentorship of Erik Erikson, he went on to get a PhD at Harvard Divinity with a thesis on Sigmund Freud. It was then that Lee became teaching assistant to Paul Tillich.

While studying at Harvard, he experimented with Psilocybin mushrooms in relation to religious experiences with religious scholar Huston Smith. He also taught and became friends with filmmaker Terrence Malick and New Yorker columnist Jacob Brackman who were enrolled in one of Tillich's courses.

== Academic career ==
Lee was later an instructor at MIT. While teaching at MIT, he met Timothy Leary and was appointed a founding editor of the Psychedelic Review, along with Richard Alpert (Ram Dass), Rolf von Eckartsberg and Ralph Metzner. Lee participated in the famous psychedelic session at Marsh Chapel at Boston University, organized by Dr. Walter Pahnke. Lee taught classics at MIT for three years, then transferred to the then newly formed University of California, Santa Cruz where he taught philosophy, religious studies and the history of consciousness for 7 years. At UCSC, Lee was "instrumental" in helping Alan Chadwick found the Chadwick Garden on campus, which still stands.

After teaching at UCSC for seven years, he was denied his chance at tenure. Historian Page Smith, who was the founding provost of the UCSC's Cowell College, resigned in protest over Lee's tenure denial at UCSC and wrote his book Killing the Spirit on this denial and on what this signified as an act taking by a "publish or perish" type of teaching institution.

For the years leading up to 1973, an issue had arisen on UCSC's campus surrounding a decision of whether Lee would be granted tenure. Page Smith explains in his work Founding Cowell College a conversation he had with the founding chancellor Dean McHenry where McHenry noted the atmosphere surrounding Lee after a class as notably filled with "enthusiastic and excited students". Lee, however, seemed to Smith to have accumulated enough opponents in senior professorships throughout UCSC that his tenure track would ultimately be ill-fated. Smith recounts in detail his painstakingly going around to first the Philosophy Department, which had "closed its ranks to Paul", based on colleague Maurice Natanson's intense dislike of Lee, most likely based largely on Lee (as a junior faculty member) choosing to state disagreement with a Natanson appointment to the university, Albert Hofstadter. Next, he went to UCSC's Religious Studies department, as Lee's teaching style was a closer fit to theology anyway, his having been a teaching assistant of influential theologian Paul Tillich and a friend of religious scholar Huston Smith. However, Page Smith explains the ongoing conversations with Joe Barber in Religious Studies found Barber not budging on finding Lee a position, with the added oddity of Barber experiencing consistent Freudian mental slip-ups throughout their discussions and calling Page "Paul" throughout his conversations with him. Then he went to Crown College, where both general faculty and students had voted to give Lee an appointment. Kenneth Thimann at Crown was fond of both Smith and Lee, but Thimann carried the message that the tenured faculty had subsequently voted quite substantially against Lee's appointment. Smith explains that this was most likely centered around Alan Chadwick's Chadwick Garden on campus and Paul Lee's role in starting it. The garden was infamous as a beginning catalyst for the organic movement and for its mystical and poetic atmosphere, which Smith explains many at Cowell were of the opinion had undermined the scientific seriousness of UCSC as an institution. He went to two other departments and had similarly found himself stymied. Then he sought the support of the "Fellowship Committee" and one of its members said they would resign if Lee was appointed. Another person then took that same stance. He explains that the senior leadership in the college did not want to "split the staff" with what was clearly such a contentious issue. Finally, he recounts, when one of the senior staff remarked that he himself would resign if Lee was appointed,

I didn’t say it to him. I thought—well then I’ll resign. I mean, I had identified myself with Paul’s cause; I believe[d] he should be kept. I believe[d] the grounds on which he was being terminated were wrong. And I [felt I] really should stand by him. And so shortly after that I told Paul that I thought the cause was lost, that I was announcing my resignation on these grounds that I then described in my letter to the faculty. So that’s it very briefly. In a certain sense it was a funny time too, you know, we explored the terrain. At every point, Paul had intractable enemies, people who felt so strongly, were so hostile to him, that they wouldn’t abide by any sort of group decision. That was really I think the heart of the matter. — Founding Cowell College, 93

Smith then resigned from the university. He recounts this episode in detail in one of his seminal works Killing the Spirit: Higher Education in America. In this work, he describes the apostrophe of institutional educational figures away from their primary prerogative to teach students and their skewed focus on a publish or perish paradigm. In a closing remark on his resignation, we hear,

Calciano: Some people probably thought that you had decided to go out in a blaze of glory.

Smith: You know that’s interesting. Two elements were involved and could be explanations. One, that people didn’t want to consider the real reason and two, that it was quixotic and in that sense nothing could be accomplished by that. [inaudible] So I suppose it’s not surprising when you think about it

Calciano: Also people were very surprised that I think you made such an issue of Lee and the publish-or-perish thing when you were a man who had published right along.

Smith: But I’ve always said at the same time that I was publishing that I was completely out of sympathy with that as a standard for retention on the faculty of any university and I have written articles about it. In the letter I wrote announcing the reasons for my resignation, I quoted a letter that I had written to the faculty several years earlier on the same subject. I could have made reference to an article that I had written eight or . . .well, ten years ago. So this wasn’t a new principle with me. I’ve always felt that way. But this time it was a case that seemed to me very important and was close to me personally. One person said to Paul Lee that I was just a sorehead, that I quit because I was mad and didn’t get my own way. I suppose there’s something in that, too. If I’d gotten my own way I wouldn’t have quit.

— Founding Cowell College, 94-95

== Non-profit career ==
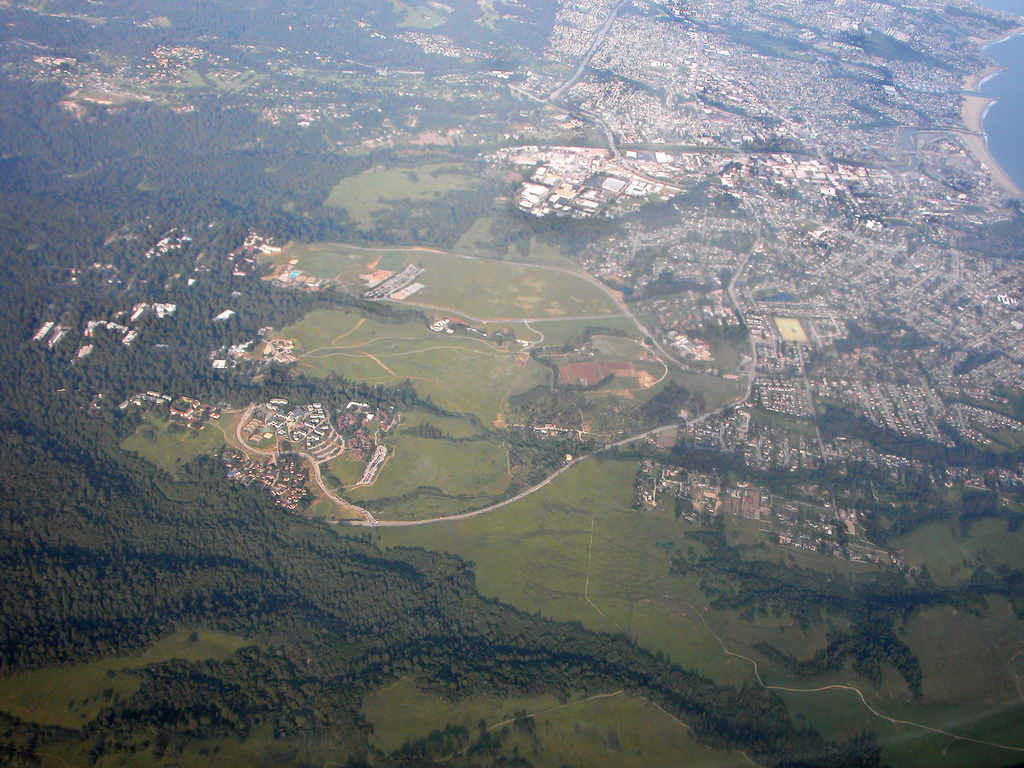
Much of the open space in this image of Santa Cruz falls within the 1,500 acres of the Greenbelt preserved as open space by Measure O in 1979

Upon leaving UCSC, Lee and longtime friend Rev. Herb Schmidt began the University Services Agency, later to become the United Services Agency, which helped to start many long-lasting non-profit efforts around Santa Cruz. One of the first projects in 1970 that Paul Lee and Page Smith had worked on together outside of petitioning the school for Lee's tenure was the Whole Earth Restaurant. The restaurant was a non-profit affiliate under University Services Agency. In an interview with KRON News in 1971, Lee describes his friend Stewart Brand's Whole Earth Catalogue as a driving inspiration for the movement that those involved in the restaurant saw themselves as being a part of, a whole earth movement. One product of the restaurant was a cookbook by Sharon Cadwallader and Judi Ohr, The Whole Earth Cookbook, which Lee wrote the preface for.

In 1973, Lee and Smith started the William James Association. It was named after William James, who was a pioneer at integrating social action with philosophical rigor, and initiated what many call pragmatism. One of the first projects for the William James Association began as a result of Page Smith's wife, Eloise Pickard Smith being selected by then-California-Governor Jerry Brown choosing Eloise to be the first director of the new California Arts Council.

In the late 1970s, Lee introduced an environmental initiative to call for a stop to a plan to build 1,200 houses and a conference center on the Pogonip open space in Santa Cruz. Architect friend Mark Primack brought the idea of a "greenbelt" into a discussion with Lee, following a visit where he saw an Austrian Greenbelt. Lee and Primack began their efforts which would bring the term "greenbelt" into the Santa Cruz public discourse. They called the resulting ballot measure the Greenbelt Initiative, or "Measure O". The Greenbelt Initiative was initially set to expire in 1990. Its main priority was to preserve the 1,500 acres of "green" open space as undeveloped land, where the city would not be allowed to extend utilities such as roadway, sewage or waterway. Lee has said he was inspired to this action by similar extensive green spaces in London.

Lee was for a time the executive director of the newly formed Herb Trade Association, and hosted several international Herb symposiums for UCSC in the backyard of his Santa Cruz home. These included famous herbalists such as Norman Farnsworth, Shiu Ying Hu, Rosemary Gladstar and James A. Duke. He is one of the founding herbalists of the American Herbalists Guild.

Lee gave several talks at Esalen Institute. Throughout his career, he has served as editor for various friends and scholars, including Paul Tillich and mathematician Ralph Abraham.

Lee served on a number of nonprofit corporation boards: Richard Alpert and Timothy Leary's International Federation for Internal Freedom and The Homeless Garden Project, which he founded.

In 1996, Lee received an alumni award from St. Olaf for his work as homeless advocate and educator. Both Lee and Page Smith have had their work with the Santa Cruz homeless population memorialized by having buildings named after them on the Housing Matters campus on Coral Street at the entry to the city. They are the Paul Lee Loft and the Page Smith Community House, respectively.

== Personal life and death ==
Lee was Harrison Ford's ex brother-in-law.

Paul Lee died in Santa Cruz, California on October 20, 2022, at the age of 91.

== Works ==
- There is a Garden in the Mind, A Memoir of Alan Chadwick and the Organic Movement in California
- The Quality of Mercy : Homelessness in Santa Cruz 1985-1992
- Florence the Goose: a True Story for Children of All Ages
- A Moral Equivalent of War
