= Bibliography of John Adams =

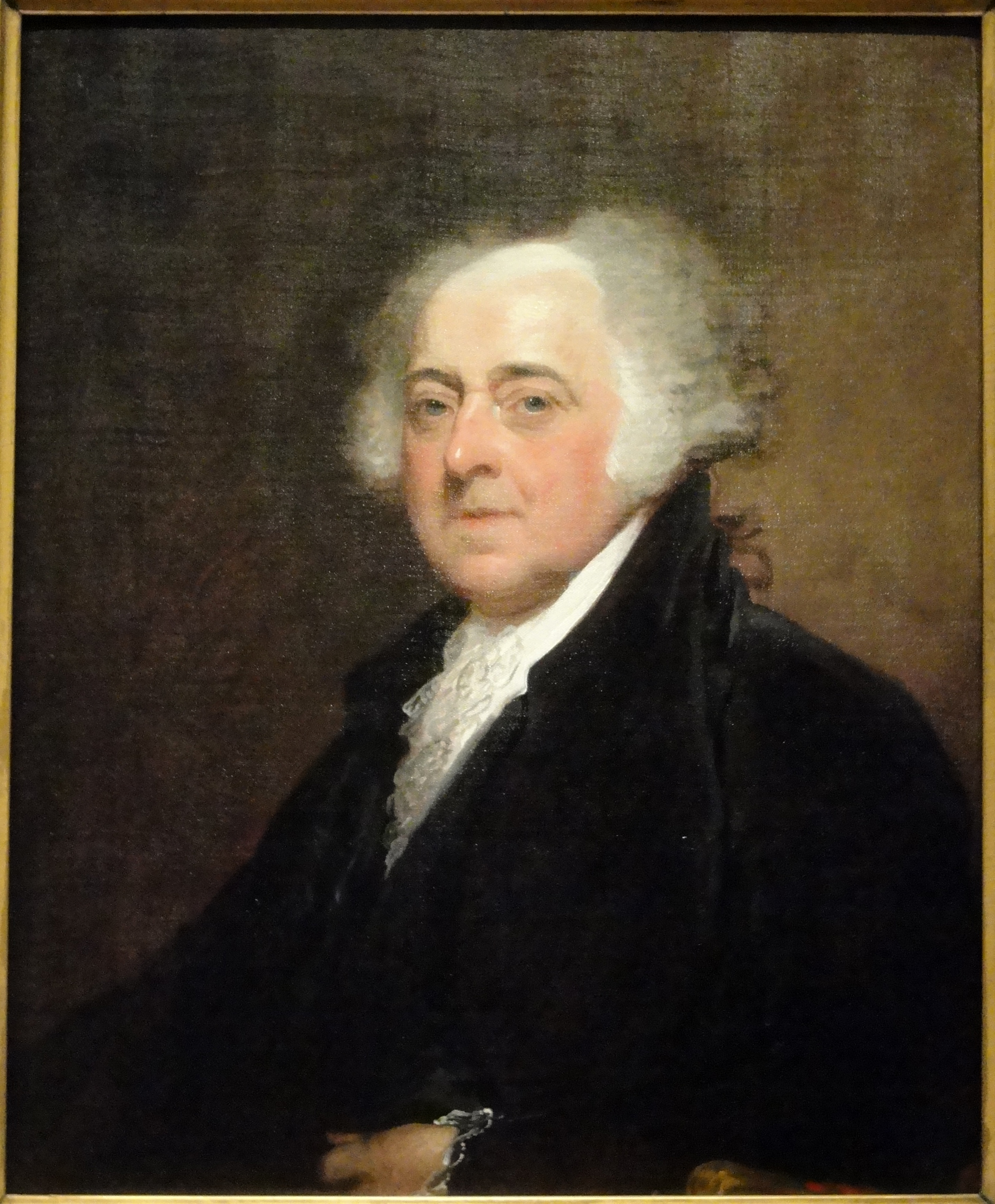
John Adams by Gilbert Stuart, c. 1815, oil on canvas – National Gallery of Art, Washington DC

The following is a list and discussion of scholarly resources relating to John Adams.

== Biographical ==
- Abrams, Jeanne E. "John Adams: An American in Paris," ch. 1 of A View from Abroad: The Story of John and Abigail Adams in Europe (New York University Press, 2021) pp. 23–54. ISBN 9781479802876
- Akers, Charles W. "John Adams" in Henry Graff, ed. (3rd ed. 2002). The Presidents: A Reference History. online
- Bernstein, Richard B. The Education of John Adams (Oxford University Press, 2020).
- Chinard, Gilbert (1933). Honest John Adams. Boston: Little, Brown, and Company.
- Diggins, John P. (2003). Schlesinger Jr., Arthur M. (ed.). John Adams. The American Presidents. New York: Time Books. ISBN 0805069372.
- Ellis, Joseph J. (1993). Passionate Sage: The Character and Legacy of John Adams. New York: W. W. Norton & Company. ISBN 0393311333.
- Ferling, John E. (1992). John Adams: A Life. Knoxville: University of Tennessee Press. ISBN 0870497308.
- Georgini, Sara. Household Gods: The Religious Lives of the Adams Family (Oxford University Press, 2019)
- Grant, James (2005). John Adams: Party of One. New York: Farrar, Straus, and Giroux. ISBN 978-0374113148.
- Harness, Cheryl. The Revolutionary John Adams (National Geographic Books, 2006).
- McCullough, David (2001). John Adams. New York: Simon & Schuster. p. 144. ISBN 978-1416575887.
- Mara, Wil. John Adams (Marshall Cavendish, 2009).
- Morse, John Torrey. John Adams. (1899) old scholarly biography online free
- Ryerson, Richard Alan, ed. (2001). John Adams and the Founding of the Republic
- Ryerson, Richard Alan (2016). John Adams's Republic: The One, the Few, and the Many 555 pp
- Shaw, Peter (1975). The Character of John Adams. New York: W. W. Norton & Company. ISBN 0393008568.
- Smith, Page (1962a). John Adams. Vol. I, 1735–1784. New York: Doubleday & Company, Inc.
- Smith, Page (1962b). John Adams. Vol. II, 1784–1826. New York: Doubleday & Company, Inc. ISBN 978-0837123486.
- Visser, Michael (2008). "Adams, John (1735–1826)". In Hamowy, Ronald (ed.). The Encyclopedia of Libertarianism. Thousand Oaks, CA: Sage; Cato Institute. pp. 5–6. doi:10.4135/9781412965811.n4. ISBN 978-1412965804. LCCN 2008009151. OCLC 750831024.
- Waldstreicher, David, ed. (2013). A Companion to John Adams and John Quincy Adams, ISBN 978-0470655580, emphasis on historiography

== Vice Presidency, Presidency and Federalist Party ==
- Allen, Gardner Weld (1909). Our Naval War With France. Boston: Houghton, Mifflin and Company. OCLC 1202325., the Quasi-War of 1798–1800
- Bernstein, R. B. "President John Adams and Four Chief Justices" New York Law School Law Review 57 (2012): 441+.
- Brown, Ralph A. The Presidency of John Adams. (2004)
- Dunn, Susan. Jefferson's second revolution: the election crisis of 1800 and the triumph of republicanism (2004).
- Elkins, Stanley M.; McKitrick, Eric (1993). The Age of Federalism. Oxford; New York: Oxford University Press. ISBN 0195068904.
- Ferling, John Adams vs. Jefferson: The Tumultuous Election of 1800 (Oxford University Press, 2004).
- Freeman, Joanne B. "The Election of 1800: A Study in the Logic of Political Change." Yale Law Journal 108.8 (1999) pp. 1959–1994. online
- Graber, Mark A. "Federalist or Friends of Adams: The Marshall Court and Party Politics." Studies in American Political Development 12.2 (1998): 229–266. online
- Heidenreich, Donald E. "Conspiracy Politics in the Election of 1796." New York History 92.3 (2011): 151–165. online
- Hoadley, John F. (1986). Origins of American Political Parties: 1789–1803. Lexington, Kentucky: University Press of Kentucky. ISBN 978-0813153209.
- Holder, Jean S. "The Sources of Presidential Power: John Adams and the Challenge to Executive Primacy." Political Science Quarterly 101.4 (1986): 601–616. online
- Kurtz, Stephen G. (1957). The Presidency of John Adams: The Collapse of Federalism, 1795–1800. Philadelphia: University of Pennsylvania Press.
- Kurtz, Stephen G. "The French Mission of 1799–1800: Concluding Chapter in the Statecraft of John Adams." Political Science Quarterly 80.4 (1965): 543–557. online
- Larson, Edward J. A magnificent catastrophe: the tumultuous election of 1800, America's first presidential campaign. (Simon and Schuster, 2007).
- Lyon, E. Wilson (September 1940). "The Franco-American Convention of 1800". The Journal of Modern History. 12 (3): 305–333. doi:10.1086/236487. JSTOR 1874761. S2CID 144516482.
- Miller, John C. (1960). The Federalist Era: 1789–1801. ISBN 978-0061330278.
- Miroff, Bruce. "John Adams' Classical Conception of the Executive." Presidential Studies Quarterly (1987): 365–382 online.
- Murphy, William J. "John Adams: The Politics of the Additional Army, 1798–1800." New England Quarterly (1979): 234–249. online
- Ray, Thomas (Winter 1983). "'Not One Cent for Tribute': The Public Addresses and American Popular Reaction to the XYZ Affair, 1798–1799". Journal of the Early Republic. 3 (4): 389–412. doi:10.2307/3122881. JSTOR 3122881.
- Scherr, Arthur. "James Monroe and John Adams: An Unlikely “Friendship”." The Historian 67.3 (2005): 405–433.
- Sharp, James Roger. American Politics in the Early Republic: The New Nation in Crisis (Yale UP, 1993).
- Sloan, Cliff, and David McKean. The great decision: Jefferson, Adams, Marshall, and the battle for the Supreme Court (PublicAffairs, 2010).
- Smith, James Morton. "President John Adams, Thomas Cooper, and Sedition: A Case Study in Suppression." Mississippi Valley Historical Review 42.3 (1955): 438–465. online
- Stinchcombe, William (October 1977). "The Diplomacy of the WXYZ Affair". The William and Mary Quarterly. 34 (4): 590–617. doi:10.2307/2936184. JSTOR 2936184.
- Thompson, Harry C. "The Second Place in Rome: John Adams as Vice President." Presidential Studies Quarterly 10.2 (1980): 171–178. online
- Turner, Kathryn (1960). "Midnight judges". University of Pennsylvania Law Review. 109: 494+. Archived from the original on October 8, 2014.
- Turner, Kathryn. "The Appointment of Chief Justice Marshall." William and Mary Quarterly (1960): 144–163. online
- White, Leonard Duppe. The Federalists: A Study in Administrative History, (1956). ISBN 978-0313201011
- Wood, Gordon S. (2009). Empire of Liberty: A History of the Early Republic, 1789–1815. Oxford History of the United States. New York: Oxford University Press. ISBN 978-0195039146.

== Books on the Founders ==
- Ellis, Joseph J. (2003). Founding Brothers: The Revolutionary Generation. New York: Knopf Doubleday Publishing Group. ISBN 978-1400077687.
- Holmes, David L. (2006). The Faiths of the Founding Fathers. Oxford: Oxford University Press. ISBN 978-0195300925.
- Wood, Gordon S. (2006). Revolutionary Characters: What Made the Founders Different. London: Penguin Books. p. 54. ISBN 1594200939.

== Political thought ==
- Fisher, Louis. "John Adams." in The Presidents and the Constitution, Volume One (New York University Press, 2020) pp. 34–46.
- Haraszti, Zoltan (1952). John Adams and the Prophets of Progress.
- Howe, John R. Jr. (1966). The Changing Political Thought of John Adams
- Morse, Anson D. "The Politics of John Adams." American Historical Review 4.2 (1899): 292–312. online free
- Rous, Sarah A. "Homo sum: John Adams Reads Terence." Classical World 113.3 (2020): 299–334.
- Scalia, Eugene. "John Adams, Legal Representation, and the 'Cancel Culture'." Harvard Journal of Law & Public Policy 44 (2021): 333+.

== Other specialized studies ==
- Boyd, Julian Parks; Gawalt, Gerard W. (1999). The Declaration of Independence: the evolution of the text. Library of Congress in association with the Thomas Jefferson Memorial Foundation. ISBN 978-0844409801.
- Chernow, Ron (2004). "29". Alexander Hamilton. London: Penguin Books. ISBN 978-1101200858.
- Herring, George C. (2008). From colony to superpower: U.S. foreign relations since 1776. Oxford; New York: Oxford University Press. p. 150. ISBN 978-0199743773.
- Holdzkom, Marianne. Remembering John Adams: The Second President in History, Memory and Popular Culture (McFarland, 2023) online.
- Maier, Pauline (1998). American Scripture: Making the Declaration of Independence. New York: Vintage Books. ISBN 978-0679779087.
- Moore, George (1866). Notes on the history of slavery in Massachusetts. New York: D. Appleton & Co. p. 201.
- Morris, Richard B. The peacemakers: The great powers and American independence (1965) Treaty of Paris 1783
- Vinton, John Adams (1858). The Vinton Memorial. S.K. Whipple. p. 298.

== Primary sources ==
- Adams, John; Adams, Charles Francis (1851). The Works of John Adams, Second President of the United States: Autobiography, continued. Diary. Essays and controversial papers of the Revolution. The Works of John Adams, Second President of the United States. Vol. 3. Little, Brown.
- Adams, John, and Abigail Adams. Selected Letters of Abigail and John Adams (Courier Dover Publications, 2021).
- Butterfield, L. H. et al., eds., The Adams Papers (1961– ). Multivolume letterpress edition of all letters to and from major members of the Adams family, plus their diaries; still incomplete. "The Adams Family Papers Editorial Project". Masshist.org.
  - "Founders Online" searchable edition
- Butterfield, L. H., ed. Adams Family Correspondence. Cambridge: Harvard University Press
- Cappon, Lester J., ed. (1959). The Adams-Jefferson Letters: The Complete Correspondence Between Thomas Jefferson and Abigail and John Adams. Chapel Hill, NC: The University of North Carolina Press. ISBN 0807842303.
- Carey, George W., ed. The Political Writings of John Adams. (2001)
- John A. Schutz and Douglass Adair, eds. Spur of Fame, The Dialogues of John Adams and Benjamin Rush, 1805–1813 (1966) ISBN 978-0865972872
- C. Bradley Thompson, ed. Revolutionary Writings of John Adams, (2001) ISBN 978-0865972858
- Adams, John, (1774) Novanglus; or, A History of the Dispute with America.
- Hogan, Margaret and C. James Taylor, eds. My Dearest Friend: Letters of Abigail and John Adams. Cambridge: Harvard University Press, 2007.
- Richardson, James D. ed. A Compilation of the Messages and Papers of the Presidents (1897), reprints his major messages and reports.
- Taylor, Robert J. et al., eds. Papers of John Adams. Cambridge: Harvard University Press
- Wroth, L. Kinvin and Hiller B. Zobel, eds. The Legal Papers of John Adams. Cambridge: Harvard University Press

== Analysis ==
External videos
- Booknotes interview with Joseph Ellis on Passionate Sage, September 5, 1993, C-SPAN
- Presentation by McCullough on John Adams at the Library of Congress, April 24, 2001, C-SPAN
- Presentation by McCullough on John Adams at the National Book Festival, September 8, 2001, C-SPAN

Adams' grandson Charles Francis Adams Sr. edited the first two volumes of The Works of John Adams, Esq., Second President of the United States. These were published between 1850 and 1856 by Charles C. Little and James Brown in Boston. The first seven chapters were produced by John Quincy Adams.

The premier modern biography was Honest John Adams, a 1933 biography by the noted French specialist in American history Gilbert Chinard, who came to Adams after writing his acclaimed 1929 biography of Jefferson. For a generation, Chinard's work was regarded as the best life of Adams, and it is still an important text in illustrating the themes of Adams' biographical and historical scholarship. Following the opening of the Adams family papers in the 1950s, Page Smith published the first major biography to use these previously inaccessible primary sources; his biography won a 1962 Bancroft Prize but was criticized for its scanting of Adams' intellectual life and its diffuseness. In 1975, Peter Shaw published The Character of John Adams, a thematic biography noted for its psychological insight into Adams' life. The 1992 character study by Joseph Ellis, Passionate Sage: The Character and Legacy of John Adams, was Ellis's first major publishing success and remains one of the most useful and insightful studies of Adams' personality. In 1992, the Revolutionary War historian and biographer John E. Ferling published his acclaimed John Adams: A Life, also noted for its psychological sensitivity. David McCullough authored the 2001 biography John Adams, which won various awards and was the basis for a 2008 TV miniseries.

In 1962, historian Bernard Bailyn published "Butterfield's Adams: Notes for a Sketch", a review of the first four volumes of the Adams Papers, including the Diary and Autobiography of John Adams, edited by Lyman Butterfield. As Bailyn's fledgling interpretation of the "meaning of certain of the ideals and ideas of the American Revolution" engulfed Adams' worlds, conspiratorial thought in the Diary became both cause and consequence of "abstractions---glittering generalities", bound to a "concreteness", a "sensuous imagination and tactile grasp of reality...by 1774 he [Adams] was convinced that he was witnessing the culmination of a deliberate conspiracy 'against the public liberty...first regularly formed and begun to be executed in 1763 or 4.' The result, unless the plot were exposed and destroyed, would be tyranny---not some vague, unfamiliar historical tyranny but one imposed by people he knew, executed by hands he had shaken." In Bailyn's sketch, when nepotism by Royal Governor Thomas Hutchinson sparked a powder keg of apocalyptic duties and acts imposed by King-in-Parliament, "Adams's social animosities took fire and became the source of a flaming hatred of state authority."
