= Tyrus Miller =

- Occupations: Dean, School of Humanities, UCI; Professor, Art History and English, UCI

Academic background
- Education: Ph.D., Stanford University, English M.A., Johns Hopkins University, Creative Writing B.A./M.A., Johns Hopkins University, Humanities

Academic work
- Institutions: University of California, Irvine

Tyrus Miller is Dean and Distinguished Professor of Art History and English at the School of Humanities, University of California, Irvine.

He is a scholar of 20th-century art, literature, and culture. His scholarship spans modernist and avant-garde movements and critical theory. He served as a tenured professor at UCSC. Miller also serves on a scientific advisory committee at UNESCO.

Miller previously served as Vice Provost and Dean of Graduate Studies, Co-Provost of Cowell College at UC Santa Cruz, and as the Director of the UC Education Abroad Program’s Study Center in Budapest, Hungary.

Miller earned his Ph.D. from Stanford University in English in 1994, an M.A. from Johns Hopkins University in Creative Writing in 1988, and a B.A./M.A. from Johns Hopkins in Humanities in 1985.

== Publications ==
- (Author) Georg Lukács and Critical Theory: Aesthetics, History, Utopia. Edinburgh University Press, 2022.
- (Author) Modernism and the Frankfurt School. Edinburgh University Press, 2014.
- (Author) Singular Examples: Artistic Politics and the Neo-Avant Garde. Northwestern University Press, 2009.
- (Author) Time Images: Alternative Temporalities in 20th-Century Theory, History, and Art. Cambridge Scholars Publishing, 2009.
- (Author) Late Modernism: Politics, Fiction, and the Arts Between the World Wars. University of California Press, 1999.
- (Editor) Aleš Erjavec, Art, Philosophy, and Ideology: Writings on Aesthetics and Visual Culture from the Avantgarde to Postsocialism. Brill Publishers, 2024.
- (Editor) The Cambridge Companion to Wyndham Lewis. Cambridge University Press, 2016.
- (Editor) Given World and Time: Temporalities in Context. Central European University Press, 2008.
- (Co-editor and translation editor with Erik Bachman) Georg Lukács, The Specificity of the Aesthetic, volume 1. Brill Publishers, 2023; paperback Haymarket Books, 2024.
- (Co-editor) Jackson Mac Low: Between Performance and Writing, eds. Tyrus Miller and Carrie Noland, Slought Foundation, 2023. Accompanies a new edition of Jackson Mac Low, The Pronouns, originally published 1979.
- (Translator) The Culture of People’s Democracy: Hungarian Essays on Literature, Art, and Democratic Transition by György Lukács. Brill Publishers, 2013; paperback Haymarket Books, 2014.
