= Speech and Reality =

Book by Eugen Rosenstock-Huessy

- Cover of Speech and Reality
- Author: Eugen Rosenstock-Huessy
- Language: English
- Subject: Social philosophy
- Genre: Philosophy
- Publisher: Argo Books
- Publication date: 1970
- Publication place: United States
- Pages: 201
- ISBN: 0-912148-02-0

Speech and Reality is a book by Eugen Rosenstock-Huessy (1888–1973), German social philosopher and is an English-language introduction to Rosenstock-Huessy’s German-language book, Soziologie. It comprises seven essays that he wrote and revised between 1935 and 1955. Rosenstock-Huessy introduces a new form of social research in which the human subject, as speaker, displaces the subject of orthodox sociology, wherein the subject can be mute. Speech and Reality is an English-language introduction to Rosenstock-Huessy’s Soziologie (sociology) and his method of inquiry for the social sciences, which is based on grammar. Using grammar as a tool, Rosenstock-Huessy describes the preconditions of anarchy, revolution, decadence, and war. John Macquarrie emphasized the importance of Rosenstock-Huessy's language-based methods and Peter Leithart cited the scope of his thinking across the depth and breadth of society.

== Overview ==
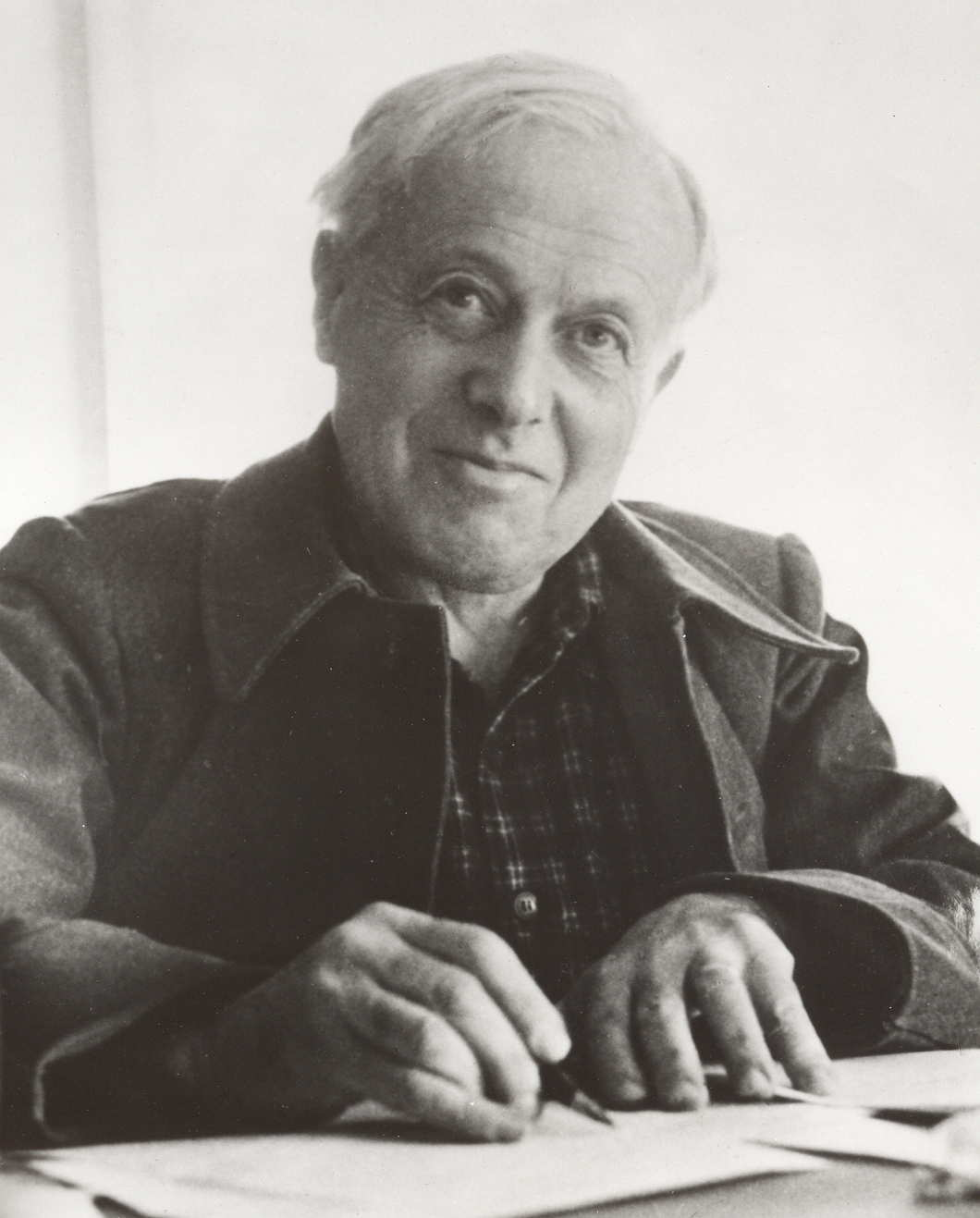
Eugen Rosenstock-Huessy.

Along with Franz Rosenzweig, Ferdinand Ebner, and Martin Buber, Rosenstock-Huessy is a major contributor to "speech thinking," and it is a central concern of several works of his, perhaps the most important, in English, being Speech and Reality. The basic idea of “speech thinking” is that our reality is not only an object to be espied, but an extension of our powers. And of all the powers which constitute us, it is speech, with its calls and responses, vocatives and imperatives, solicitations and appeals, that enables us to undertake collective action and thereby transform ourselves and the world around us. Speech does not merely describe or denote what exists, it enables us to draw out from ourselves possibilities and realities which are yet unrealized.

In place of Descartes’ "I think therefore I am," which is the clarion call to become lords and masters over nature and thereby to treat nature as a great machine subject to our will and our cognitive capacities, Rosenstock-Huessy taught "I respond, although I will be changed." This is a formulation, which comes from the recognition that life calls us into ever-fresh tasks and that we never approach urgent things already in full knowledge of an outcome. Being open to speech is being open to the various insights and requests, the urgencies and necessities that are encapsulated in speech. It is the recognition that we are mutual creators of each other and the world around us; that is a reality we cannot avoid, though we can easily fail to see what it involves. That our words become flesh is, in fact a variant of another fact—that we dissolve and resolve again in acts of love. Speech thinking, in other words, stands in the closest relationship to the law of love.

Rosenstock-Huessy wrote in Speech and Reality:

Whoever speaks believes in the unity of mankind. And he believes that the unity of mankind is not produced by physical or political or economic or racial reasons but by our faith in speech. We all believe in the Holy Ghost, the Oneness above and around our particular way of looking at the world. The individual’s greatest freedom has as its corollary the spirit’s greatest necessity. If all men are bound by one truth, then my-truth makes sense. If it does not, I go mad with my freedom.

== Assessment of Speech and Reality ==
In Commonweal magazine, John Macquarrie writes about Speech and Reality:

The Author believes as did Dilthey before him that social sciences must suffer from being forced into the methodological mold of the natural sciences. Anyone acquainted with the kind of psychology and sociology commonly taught in the United States today could hardly fail to agree, and there is in fact currently a good deal of dissatisfaction with the naturalistic model used in these sciences. But where do we look for a better method? Rosenstock-Huessy suggests that we look to language. Speech is the basic social reality. Grammar, in turn, is the science, which describes and analyzes the structures of language. Hence grammar is the foundation for developing a methodology for the social sciences. It must be added at once that it is not conventional grammar that the author has in mind. The grammar we learn in school and which enables us to reel off conjugations and the like is a grammar which has killed the drama and dignity of living speech. Rosenstock-Huessy has in mind a renewed grammar, a "higher grammar," as he sometimes calls it, which will attend to the nuances of tense and mood, and will see in these the structures of the social reality.... This book could make very helpful contributions toward working out a more human approach to the study of the human phenomenon.

Peter Leithart writes on "The Relevance of Eugen Rosenstock-Huessy" and his methods:

It’s not only the scope that impresses, but the integration. There is a passionate religious impulse behind everything he wrote, and it’s all made immediately, existentially real. But he moves rapidly from the large movements of history down to individual and family experience.
