= Out of Revolution =

1993 book by Eugen Rosenstock-Huessy

- Book cover for Out of Revolution
- Author: Eugen Rosenstock-Huessy
- Language: English
- Subject: European History
- Genre: History
- Publisher: Berg Publishers, Inc.
- Publication date: 1993
- Publication place: United States
- Pages: 795
- ISBN: 0-912148-05-5
- OCLC: 53278

Out of Revolution is a book by Eugen Rosenstock-Huessy (1888-1973), German social philosopher. The book counters conventional historiography as a “theory of history: how history should be understood, how historians should write about it,” as Harold J. Berman wrote in the introduction to the book. Page Smith, Reinhold Niebuhr, and Lewis Mumford all wrote of the significance of this work having new insights on the history of Western Civilization.

== Background ==
The book originated in his experience as a soldier during World War I, through which he was forced to realize "that war was one thing to the soldiers of all nations and another thing to the people at home." His intention in writing, he says, is to "bequeath a lasting memory" of this experience to the next generations, with the design of overcoming a particular kind of inertia, a tendency to regard the sanity-shattering upheavals by which new epochs are initiated as though these only append a new chapter to the end of events that have passed. This tendency to analyze without sympathy the events even of one's own lifetime, Rosenstock-Huessy depicts as a willful and tragic forgetfulness. We must experience the rewriting of history in our lifetime, he said, because "the world's history is our own history"; otherwise, "it would be nothing but a hopeless library of dust".

== Analysis ==
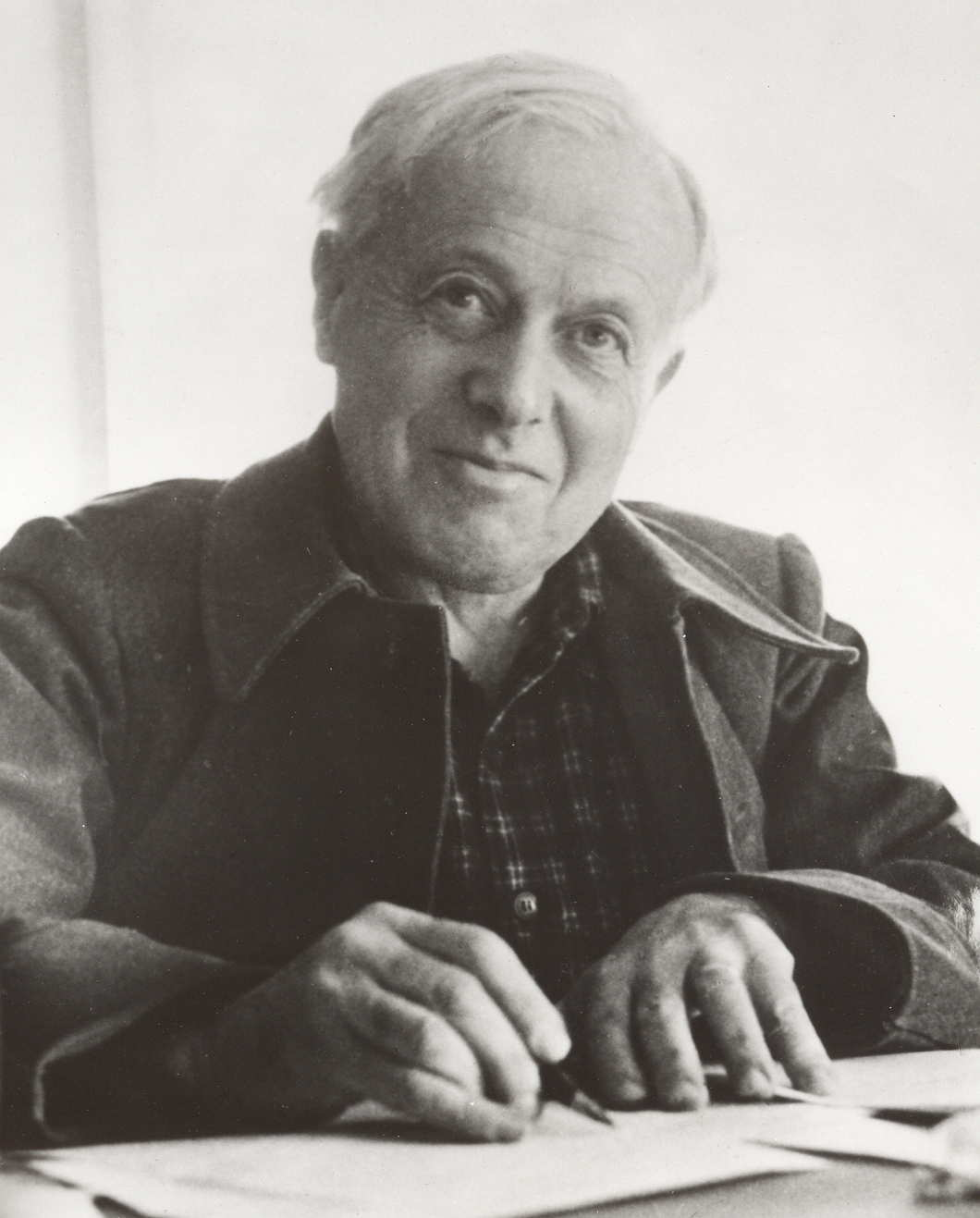
Eugen Rosenstock-Huessy. Photo courtesy of Marriot Huessy, Eugen Rosenstock-Huessy Fund

The central 'thesis' of Out of Revolution (also laid out in Die europaeischen Revolutionen, which adopts a different order and provides a more detailed theoretical casting of the material) was that the second millennium had created a planetary consciousness, though not yet a planetary peace. That consciousness had been formed from the great convulsions that occurred in Europe in what he terms the 'total revolutions.' Unlike rebellions or regime overthrows, 'total revolutions' are driven by a desire to achieve the longed for 'kingdom of heaven' - they are forms of the 'last judgment', in which one age is condemned and a new one erected to deliver the promise of the second coming. From Gregory VII's desire to revolutionize the Church—what Rosenstock-Huessy calls the Papal Revolution, and what is more commonly referred to as the investiture conflict—to Marx and Lenin's attempt to unify the workers of the world, Europe and then the World have been swept up by forces which were first unleashed in the struggles to end the unbearable injustices of the past and create the promised kingdom. Rosenstock-Huessy analyses the major contributions/ legacies of what he calls the 'secular revolutions'—the Russian, the French, the English and the German (the Reformation)—and the 'ecclesiastical' revolutions—a more complex array of forces which involves a detailed analysis of the Holy Roman Empire as he works his way, inter alia, through the investiture conflict, the war between Guelfs and Ghibbelines, the Italian warring states, the Italian Renaissance, the survival of the Austria-Hungarian empire, industrialisation and the founding of America and its subsequent revolution.

At the heart of this bifurcation into secular and ecclesiastical revolutions is a major and recurring idea in Rosenstock-Huessy's work: that the Great War (and after its outbreak he included the Second World War) is a Marriage of War and Revolution. That is, he saw that the great revolutions had created a 'circulatory spirit' forming the collective aspirations that had driven the European nations and their colonies to fight for one final peace which would lead to what he called a 'metanomical society,' a society in which there could exist a concordance of discordances, a peace in which differences could be not only be tolerated, but provide fecund tensions, as the fruits of all this struggle could be harvested. The European Union, for all its flaws, provides the kind of institutional resolution, which Out of Revolution was seeking.

For Rosenstock-Huessy, the millennium of revolution had been the outgrowth of the millennium in which the Church had been formed to create fellowship and love of the neighbor. The explosions of the revolutions were the angry acts of those who could no longer bear institutions they found hateful and divisive and contrary to the very commandments that had formed the Christian nations of Europe. For Rosenstock-Huessy, that the French and Russians would then turn upon Christianity itself was part of the demand of the 'Holy Spirit,' that love must ever find new forms. He held—or rather had faith—that the next millennium would be one in which Christianity would become incognito and the promised Johannine Age and its age of universal fellowship be realized.

== Assessments of Out of Revolution ==
The historian Page Smith considers this Rosenstock-Huessy’s greatest work in English. He wrote in his book, The Historian and History:

Eugen Rosenstock-Huessy was one of those Europeans who at the end of World War I decided that the war had made familiar categories of thought obsolete. He undertook, in a series of books and articles, to illuminate the relation between history and the human experience and to explicate the progress of man through history toward a common future. ... The revolutions of mankind, Huessy wrote, "create new time-spans for our life on earth. They give man’s soul a new relation between present, past, and future; and by doing so they give us time to start our life on earth all over again, with a new rhythm and a new faith." This is the framework for Huessy’s history of Europe and it may safely be said to be the first historical work written under the new dispensation. As such, it is of profound significance for contemporary history, but its very uniqueness has left it high and dry on the banks of academe. Nobody knew what to make of it because nobody had seen anything like it before.

Reinhold Niebuhr said of Out of Revolution:

Really a remarkable book, full of profound insights into the meaning of modern European history. I have not read a book in a long time which is so imaginative in relating the various economic, religious and political forces at play in modern history, to each other. Ordinary historical interpretations are pale and insipid in comparison with it.

Lewis Mumford said of Out of Revolution:

Rosenstock-Huessy’s is a powerful and original mind. What is most important in this philosopher’s work is the understanding of the relevance of traditional values to a civilization still undergoing revolutionary transformations; and this contribution will gain rather than lose significance in the future.
