= I Am an Impure Thinker =

Book by Eugen Rosenstock-Huessy

- Cover of I Am an Impure Thinker
- Author: Eugen Rosenstock-Huessy
- Language: English
- Subject: Social philosophy
- Genre: Philosophy
- Publisher: Argo Books
- Publication date: 1970
- Publication place: United States
- Pages: 248
- ISBN: 0-912148-56-X
- OCLC: 48806333

I Am an Impure Thinker is a book by Eugen Rosenstock-Huessy (1888–1973), German social philosopher and is an English-language introduction to Rosenstock-Huessy's German-language book, Soziologie. It is a collection of essays, which represents an accessible introduction to Rosenstock-Huessy's thought. The "impure thinker" title reflects the author's escape from the bounds set by academic tradition, his belief that thought must be accompanied by passionate convictions and engagement, and that sterile intellect is a disease. While apparently unrelated, the essays nevertheless have an underlying unity, which runs through his discussion of the concepts of William James, the Gospels, the Egyptian symbol of Ka, and other uncommon sources. Together the essays contribute to the discovery of a post-theological language. They answer Dietrich Bonhoeffer's question: "How can we speak of God to modern man who 'has come of age?'" It has been recognized as a summary of Rosenstock-Huessy's insights into Western culture by such thinkers as W. H. Auden, Dietrich Bonhoeffer, Martin E. Marty, and Harold J. Berman.

== Overview ==
Rosenstock-Huessy's collection of essays summarize themes and major methodological concerns from his work and provide autobiographical material. In the opening chapter, Farewell to Descartes, he writes:

I am an impure thinker. I am hurt, swayed, shaken, elated, disillusioned, shocked, comforted, and I have to transmit my mental experiences lest I die. And although I may die. To write a book is no luxury. It is a means of survival.

The emphasis upon his impurity is, in large part, one further missive directed at the claims of philosophers who wish, through reason, to achieve truth in its purity. We are, for Rosenstock-Huessy, always caught up in the stresses and strains and impurities of the world and we have a much better chance of improving our condition if we accept this reality and get on with it.

In the foreword of the book, W. H. Auden writes:

Whatever he may have to say about God, Man, the World, Time, etc, Rosenstock-Huessy always starts from his own experience as a human being, who must pass through successive stages between birth and death, learning something essential from each of them

That summarizes of Rosenstock-Huessy's procedure, which combines the personal and the socio-historical.

== Assessment of Speech and Reality ==
In the foreword of the book, W. H. Auden writes:

Rosenstock-Huessy has uncovered many truths hidden from his predecessors.... Whatever he may have to say about God, Man, the World, Time, etc., Rosenstock-Huessy always starts out from his own experience as a human being, who must pass through successive stages between birth and death, learning something essential from each one of them.

Eberhardt Bethge wrote of the author:

Rosenstock-Huessy refuses to do anything in the usual way. But you may well turn yourself over to him. Behind everything stands the committed responsibility of a great teacher who opens our eyes.

In his book, By Way of Response, Martin E. Marty writes:

Let me lead into them by comparing a person's life to what a favorite philosopher of mine, Eugen Rosenstock-Huessy, once wrote about a volume. "One book is about one thing; at least the good ones are." The most rich and varied lives I contend, are also "about" one thing. Not Rosenstock-Huessy's at first glance: "I am an impure thinker, I am hurt, swayed, shaken, elated, disillusioned, shocked, comforted, and I have to transmit my mental experiences lest I die. And although I may die." An impure thinker he was, but never an undirected one. His life was finally about his motto, respondeo etsi mutabor, "I respond although I shall be changed." Responding did not mean being an antenna constantly turning for a signal. His life was not like a sponge or blotter that only soaks up substance from others, a mirror to bounce back images. A forceful ego was there, as assuredly as in José Ortega y Gasset's self-summary, "I am I and my circumstances." This points to a perfect tension between the freedom of self and the fate of environment.

In his book, Law and Revolution: The Formation of the Western Legal Tradition, Harold J. Berman cites I am an Impure Thinker as contributing to the insights on the discussion of law and revolution.
