= Mary Adams Holmes =

American artist and art history professor

Mary Adams Holmes (May 8, 1910 – January 21, 2002) was an American artist and art history professor. Her work integrated Greek mythology, Jungian themes, biblical figures, tarot imagery, and literary references. She taught at the University of Iowa, Ohio State University, the University of California, Los Angeles, and the University of California, Santa Cruz.

== Early life ==
Mary Holmes was born on May 8, 1910, in Aberdeen, South Dakota, to John Horace Holmes and Marie Heloise Adams. Her sister, Sara Holmes Boutelle, was a year older and the two women remained close throughout their lives.

In 1914, the family moved to Chicago where Mary attended one of the first Montessori schools in the United States. The academic freedom in her elementary years led Holmes to focus on drawing and painting until, when she was eight, her teachers urged her to learn to read. She later transferred to Miss Haire's School for Girls and studied there until her parents moved to Musselshell, Montana, when she attended Hannah Moore Academy, a boarding school near Baltimore, Maryland.

== Career ==
After graduating from Hannah Moore Academy in 1927, Holmes attended Hollins College and earned an undergraduate degree in philosophy. She said “I deliberately chose a school that would have nothing to do with art. It had no art history, it had no studio art. I chose it because of that, because it might affect my mind and I didn’t want that." After graduating from Hollins in 1931, she spent a year in Europe with her sister, Sara Boutelle. There she took classes at the University of Berlin & Academie Collorossi in Paris.

When Holmes returned to the United States, she enrolled in Johns Hopkins University to study with Max Brödel, a pioneer in medical painting. where they spent six weeks drawing one bone. She later remarked that, “I’d thought we were done the first day but we just kept looking, and it was invaluable. I wouldn’t trade anything for it." Although the experience impacted her work, she did not complete the program because it was “too bloody and painful.”

Holmes began teaching after her divorce, as a single mother requiring an income. After a year as a teacher at her alma mater, Hannah Moore Academy, she enrolled at the University of Iowa where she earned a double master's degree in painting and art history. There she became close with art professors Emil Ganso and Philip Guston and, after completing the masters program, she joined the faculty to lecture in art history. When the U.S. entered World War II in 1941, several professors at the University of Iowa were drafted, offering Holmes the opportunity to take over teaching classes part-way through the semester. She credited this experience with compelling her to acquire a depth and breadth of material which improved her abilities as a lecturer.

From 1947 to 1953 Holmes taught art history at Ohio State University, Columbus, and one of the first educational television programs on the local Columbus station. For the same station she hosted late-night movies dressed as Vampira. When she went on to teach at UCLA, in 1953, she continued her career in television with a full for-credit course on the local Los Angeles station which enrolled 1,058 students.

At UCLA, Holmes became friends with historian Page Smith, who, in the early 1960s, was recruited as the first provost of Cowell College at the new University of California, Santa Cruz. Smith invited her to join the college as a lecturer and she became one of the first women faculty members at UCSC. She retired from UCSC in 1977 and continued to give public lectures in Santa Cruz for several decades.

Holmes's sister, Sara Boutelle, once told a reporter, “Of course, she’s not really an academic. She never has been and never wanted to be one though she has degrees and honors and all the trappings. But something about her lectures just captivates people".

== Art ==
Holmes rejected modern abstraction in art, favoring instead a more traditional approach which featured figures and narrative. She believed that “the whole function of art is to make visible what is invisible”.

Her broad academic background was essential to her artistic practice, as she believed it was "extremely important for the artist to know as much as possible about everything." Her art reflected a diverse interest in stories and across time: ancient India, medieval Germany, and the French Renaissance. Although she draws from diverse subject matter, she rarely painted from a live model or photograph.

Holmes included animals alongside the human figures. She considered this practice aligned with Hindu art which often portrays figures as either part-animal or with an animal counterpart.

Holmes’ culminating work was the chapel that she built on her property in the early 1990s. Within its three rooms, she curated paintings to specific themes: The Wisdom Chapel exploring the myths and meaning of womanhood, the Holy Spirit Chapel featuring nine gifts of the Holy Spirit, and the Lady Chapel telling the story of the Virgin Mary.

== Personal life ==
In 1935, Holmes and her friend, Barbara Betz, took over a former speakeasy and Chinese restaurant in Madison, Wisconsin, and returned it to its original Victorian appearance. There, they opened a student boarding house and art salon.

On June 15, 1936, Holmes married Gerald O’Malley who was involved in the Madison real estate business. She left him a year later and went to stay with her sister in New York City where her son, Michael O’Malley, was born in October 1937. She never remarried. Later, Holmes noted that “If it hadn’t been for my divorce, I would probably still be a philosophical housewife, so I suppose that was the turning point in my career."

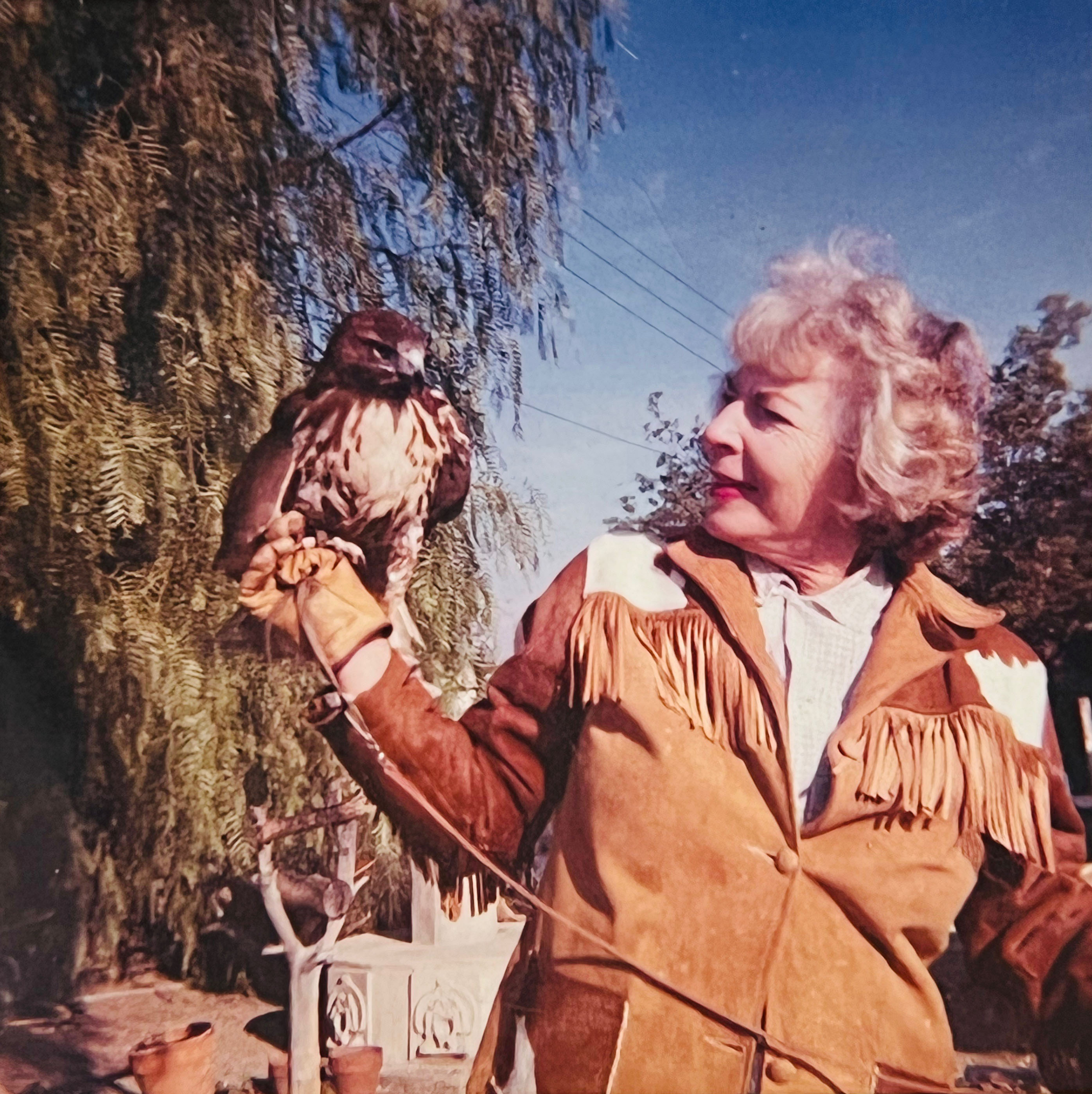
Mary Holmes posing with her falcon

Holmes admired and cared for animals all her life. A photo of Holmes and her son, Michael, each on horseback, appeared in the Iowa City Press-Citizen in 1946 when she was teaching at the University of Iowa.

While teaching at UCLA in the 1950s, she lived in a medieval-style castle in the countryside of Agoura with her parents and a menagerie of animals.

On her property in Santa Cruz where she built her chapel, she kept horses, cows, sheep, goats, chickens, peacocks, dogs, and cats. On a personal level, she believed that, “Animals are terribly important to people. I have a very strong theory that people who are not accompanied by animals suffer from that."

== Legacy ==
Mary Holmes died at Dominican Hospital in Santa Cruz on January 21, 2002.

In one obituary, John Dizikes, a fellow faculty member at UCSC, remembered Holmes as “an incomparable colleague" who "was delightful company". He admired her courage and "her intense professionalism as an art historian, which she rather disguised because she was full of so many eccentric opinions".
