= John Dizikes =

American historian

John Dizikes (November 8, 1932 – December 26, 2018) was Professor of American Studies at the University of California, Santa Cruz. He served as Cowell College provost and was a recipient of the UCSC Alumni Association's Distinguished Teaching Award. Dizikes was a founding faculty member at UCSC, which he joined in 1965, just before the university opened to students, and taught for 35 years until his retirement in 2000.

Dizikes was the author of five books and numerous articles. His 1993 book Opera in America: A Cultural History won the 1993 National Book Critics Circle Award for Criticism. The book also won the 1993 Commonwealth Club of California's gold medal for Non-Fiction. The Washington Post called it "the first book of its kind" and "a tour de force" of history. Dizikes also wrote extensively about sports in American culture, had an interest in thoroughbred horse racing, and in 2000 published a biography of Hall of Fame jockey Tod Sloan. His most recent book, Love Songs: The Lives, Loves, and Poetry of Nine American Women, was published in early 2018.

An award bearing his name, the John Dizikes Teaching Award in Humanities, is presented each year to an instructor at UCSC, and includes an additional scholarship grant for undergraduate students who have studied with award recipients.

== Books ==
- Love Songs: The Lives, Loves, and Poetry of Nine American Women. New York: Animal Mitchell. 2018. ISBN 978-1944037765.
- Yankee Doodle Dandy : The Life and Times of Tod Sloan. New Haven: Yale University Press. 2000. ISBN 978-0-300-08334-7. OCLC 44046818.
- Opera in America : A Cultural History. New Haven: Yale University Press. 1993. ISBN 978-0-300-05496-5. OCLC 26974819.
- Sportsmen and Gamesmen: From the Years that Shaped American Ideas About Winning and Losing and How to Play the Game. Boston [Mass.]: Houghton Mifflin. 1981. ISBN 978-0-395-27776-8. OCLC 6421815.
- Britain, Roosevelt, and the New Deal: British Opinion, 1932-1938. New York: Garland Pub. 1978. ISBN 978-0-8240-3631-7. OCLC 4834677.
