= Eugen Rosenstock-Huessy =

German-American social philosopher

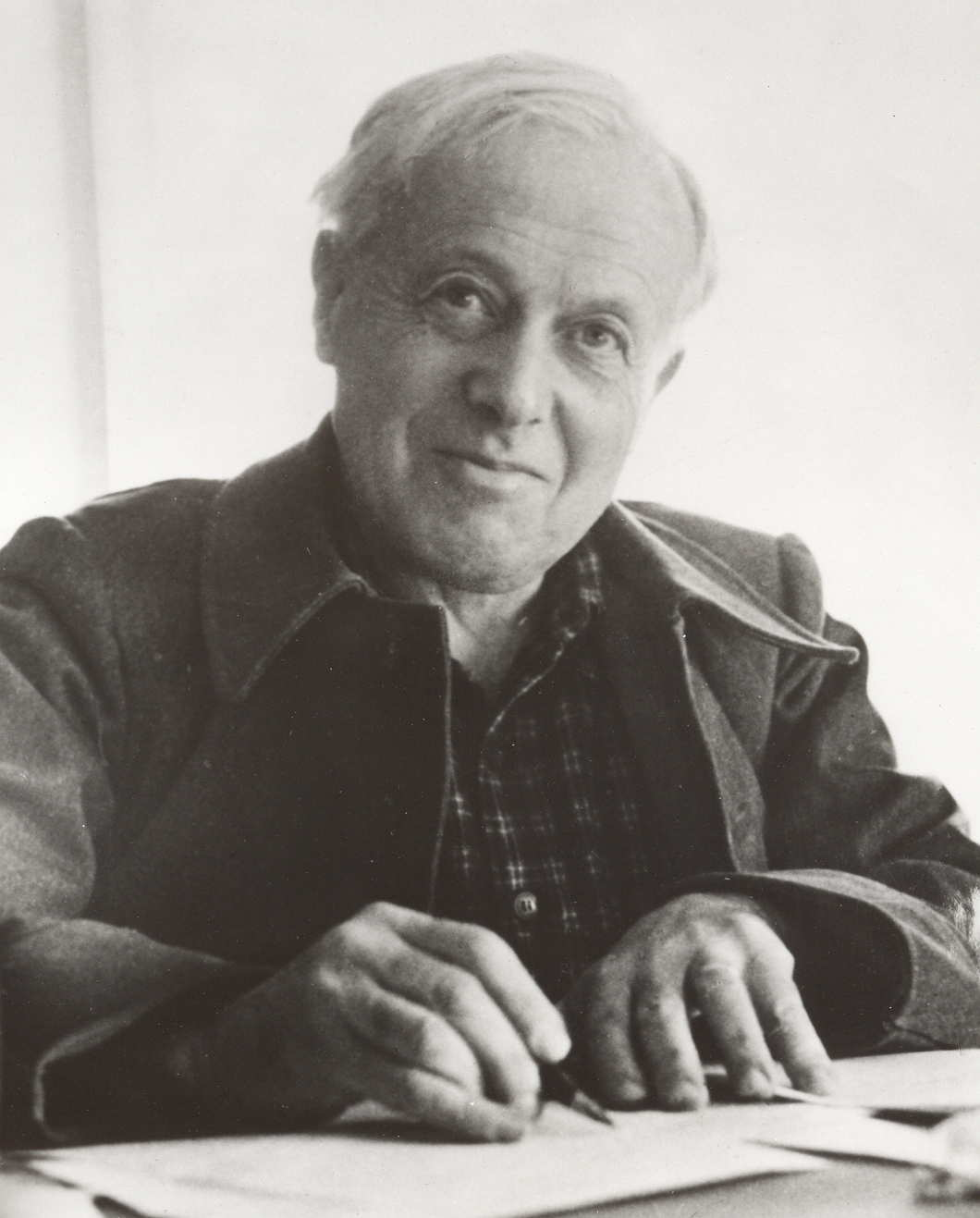
- Born: Eugen Friedrich Moritz Rosenstock; July 6, 1888; Berlin, German Empire
- Died: February 24, 1973 (aged 84); Norwich, Vermont, U.S.
- Resting place: Hillside Cemetery, Norwich, Vermont
- Education: Doctor of Law (1909) and Doctor of Philosophy (1923), University of Heidelberg
- Occupation: Professor
- Employer(s): Harvard University, Dartmouth College
- Known for: Books and lectures on social philosophy
- Spouse: Margrit Rosenstock-Huessy
- Children: Hans Rosenstock Huessy
- Parent(s): Theodor and Paula Rosenstock

Eugen Rosenstock-Huessy (German pronunciation: [ˈɔʏɡeːn ˈʁoːzn̩ʃtɔk ˈhʏsi, ˈɔʏɡn̩ -]; July 6, 1888 – February 24, 1973) was a historian and social philosopher, whose work spanned the disciplines of history, theology, sociology, linguistics and beyond. Born in Berlin, Germany into a non-observant Jewish family, the son of a prosperous banker, he converted to Christianity in his late teens, and thereafter the interpretation and reinterpretation of Christianity was a consistent theme in his writings. After graduating from High School, he served as a voluntary teacher at the Samsonschule in Wolfenbuettel. He met and married Margrit Hüssy in 1914. In 1925, the couple legally combined their names. (Note: In Germany, their family name became "Rosenstock-Hüssy". In the United States, it was adapted to English spelling as "Rosenstock-Huessy". Published references in this article use the latter spelling.) They had a son, Hans, in 1921.

Rosenstock-Huessy served as an officer in the German army during World War I. His experience caused him to reexamine the foundations of liberal Western culture. He then pursued an academic career in Germany as a specialist in medieval law, which was disrupted by the rise of Nazism. In 1933, after Adolf Hitler became Chancellor of Germany, he emigrated to the United States where he began a new academic career, initially at Harvard University and then at Dartmouth College, where he taught from 1935 to 1957.

Although never part of the mainstream of intellectual discussion during his lifetime, his work drew the attention of W. H. Auden, Harold Berman, Martin Marty, Lewis Mumford, Page Smith, and others. Rosenstock-Huessy may be best known as the close friend of and correspondent with Franz Rosenzweig. Their exchange of letters is considered by scholars of religion and theology to be indispensable in the study of the modern encounter of Jews with Christianity. In his work, Rosenstock-Huessy discussed speech and language as the dominant shaper of human character and abilities in every social context. He is viewed as belonging to a group of thinkers who revived post-Nietzschean religious thought.

== Early life ==
Rosenstock-Huessy was born Eugen Friedrich Moritz Rosenstock in Berlin, Germany on July 6, 1888, to Theodor and Paula Rosenstock. His father, a scholarly man, was a banker and a member of the Berlin Stock Exchange. He was the only son among seven surviving children.

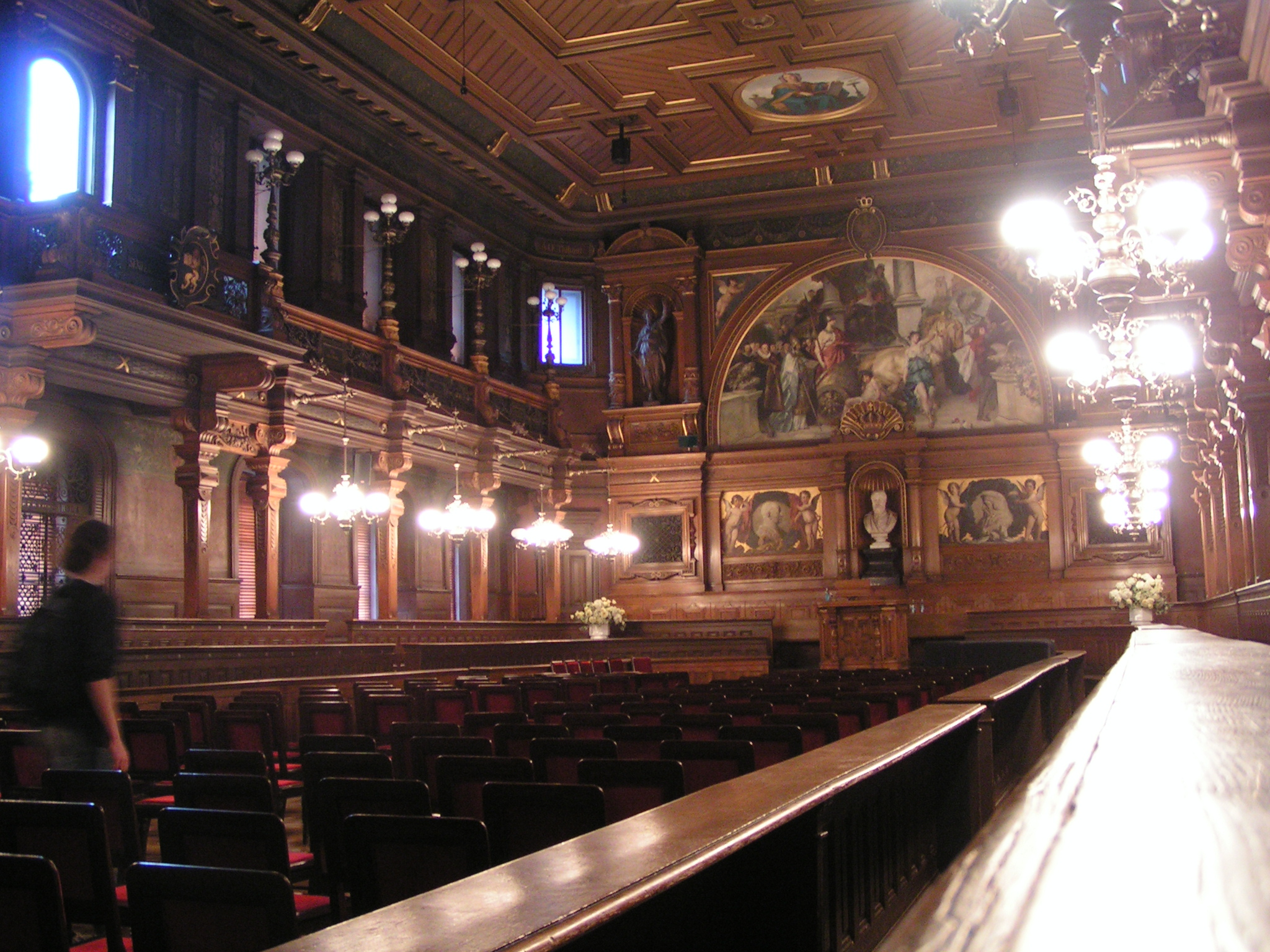
Old Assembly Hall, University of Heidelberg

Despite his parents' Jewish heritage, his family "celebrated some Christian holidays, in keeping with other German families at the time." He joined the Lutheran Protestant Church at age 17 and was christened at age 18. He remained a proponent of Christianity's foundational significance throughout the rest of his life.

After graduating from a secondary school (gymnasium) with very high academic standards and an emphasis on classical languages and literature, Rosenstock-Huessy pursued law studies at the universities of Zurich, Heidelberg, and Berlin. He corresponded with Franz Rosenzweig and Hans Ehrenberg, regarding the relationship of man with God, as understood through Judaism and Christianity. In 1909 the University of Heidelberg granted him a doctorate in law. In 1912 he became a Privatdozent, a preliminary qualification to becoming a professor, at the University of Leipzig, where he taught constitutional law and the history of law until 1914.

In 1914 Rosenstock-Huessy visited Florence, Italy to conduct historical research. There he met Margrit Hüssy, a Swiss art history major. They married later that year. World War I broke out shortly thereafter.

== World War I ==
At the onset of World War I, the German Army drafted Rosenstock-Huessy and stationed him at the Western Front, including 18 months at Verdun, until the war's end. "During this period he organized courses for the troops, replacing the limited instruction in patriotism with broader topics. In 1916, he and his friend, the Jewish philosopher Franz Rosenzweig, also on active duty, exchanged letters on Judaism and Christianity." That correspondence has become well known as a dialog between proponents of the two related religions. Rosenstock-Huessy's work, Judaism Despite Christianity, contains much of this correspondence.

== Interwar period ==
After World War I, Rosenstock-Huessy became active in labor issues, focusing on improving education as a means to improve the societal standard of living. He returned to academia and started publishing his first noted works.

=== Labor education ===
Rosenstock-Huessy did not return to his teaching post at the University of Leipzig. Instead, he obtained a position with Daimler-Motoren-Gesellschaft, the German car manufacturer, in Stuttgart, Germany. In 1919, he founded and became the editor until 1921 of the first factory newspaper in Germany, the Daimler Werkzeitung (Work Newspaper).

In 1921, Rosenstock founded Die Akademie der Arbeit (the Academy of Labor) in Frankfurt am Main. "This institution offered courses and seminars for blue-collar workers, but he resigned in 1923 over differences with the trade union representatives. Nevertheless, he did not give up his involvement with adult education and his efforts to give industrial workers a voice of their own in society." He co-founded the Patmos Verlag publishing house, which published works on "new religious, philosophical, and social perspectives."

=== Return to academia ===
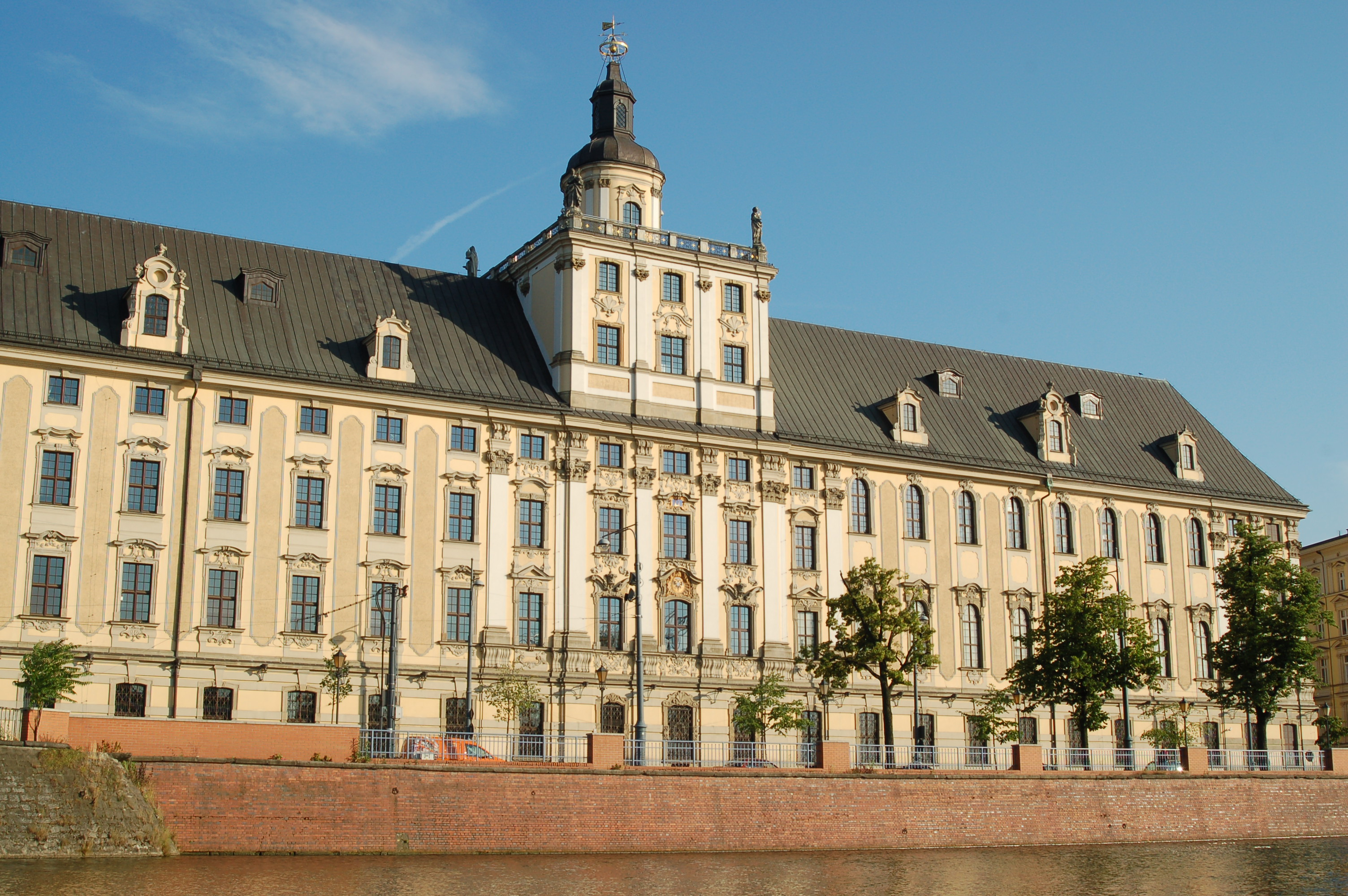
The main building of the University of Wrocław (Breslau), seen from the Pomeranian Bridge (Most Pomorski) spanning the Oder River.

In 1923, Rosenstock-Huessy received a second doctorate in philosophy from the University of Heidelberg. He then lectured at the Technical University of Darmstadt in the faculty of social science and social history until he was offered a job at the University of Breslau as a full professor of German legal history, a position he held from 1923 until January 30, 1933.

During this period, Rosenstock-Huessy became active in many other ways at the University of Breslau. He helped organize voluntary work service camps—Löwenberger Arbeitslager (Löwenberg Work Camp)—for students, young farmers, and young workers to address the living and labor conditions at coal mines in Waldenburg, Lower Silesia.

In 1926, Joseph Wittig, a reform-minded Roman Catholic priest, was excommunicated and thus lost his right to teach church history at the University of Breslau. Rosenstock-Huessy stood by his friend, Wittig, in this affair. In 1927 and 1928, they co-authored Das Alter der Kirche (The Age of the Church), which contained two volumes of essays on the history of the Church and a third volume devoted to documents leading up to Wittig's excommunication.

In 1925, he co-founded a journal, Die Kreatur (The Creature), which was edited by Wittig, Martin Buber, and Viktor von Weizsäcker, men of widely different perspectives, and which lasted until 1930. According to his recent publishers, "Among the contributors [of Die Kreatur] were Nicholas Berdyaev, Lev Shestov, Franz Rosenzweig, Ernst Simon, Hugo Bergmann, Edgar Dacque, Hans Ehrenberg, Rudolf Ehrenberg, Marie Luise Enckendorff, Hermann Herrigel, Rudolf Hallo, Edith Klatt, Fritz Klatt, Ernst Michel, Wilhelm Michel, Werner Picht, Florens Christian Rang, Heinrich Sachs, and Margarette Susman. Each of these [people] had, between 1910 and 1932, in one way or another, offered an alternative to the idealism, positivism, and historicism that dominated German universities."

Soon after January 30, 1933, when the National Socialists (Nazis) assumed power in Germany, Rosenstock-Huessy resigned from the University of Breslau and departed Germany that year. By the end of 1933, he received an appointment as lecturer in German Art and Culture at Harvard University with the help of a professor of government there.

=== Publications, 1914–1933 ===
Rosenstock-Huessy published his medieval study Königshaus und Stämme in Deutschland zwischen 911 und 1250 (The Royal House and the Tribes in Germany between 911 and 1250) in 1914, which he had written in Leipzig and was the source of recognition for his second doctorate. In 1920, Rosenstock-Huessy published Die Hochzeit des Krieges und der Revolution (The Marriage of War and Revolution), "a collection of current events essays that were replete with visionary thinking and practical warnings of conflicts to come." In 1921, Rosenstock-Huessy published Angewandte Seelenkunde (Practical Knowledge of the Soul) wherein he developed a new method for the social sciences based on language, the spoken word, and his "grammatical approach". He later called this approach "metanomics". Together with Josef Wittig, a Roman Catholic, he published Das Alter der Kirche (The Age of the Church) in 1927-28. That work contained two volumes of essays on the life of the Church and a third volume devoted to documents leading up to Wittig's excommunication."

"While he was still teaching at Breslau, Rosenstock wrote and published the first of his major works: Die Europäischen Revolutionen: Volkscharaktere und Staatenbildung (The European Revolutions and the Character of Nations; 1931). This book showed how 1,000 years of European history had been created from five different European national revolutions that collectively came to an end in World War I."

== Dartmouth College ==
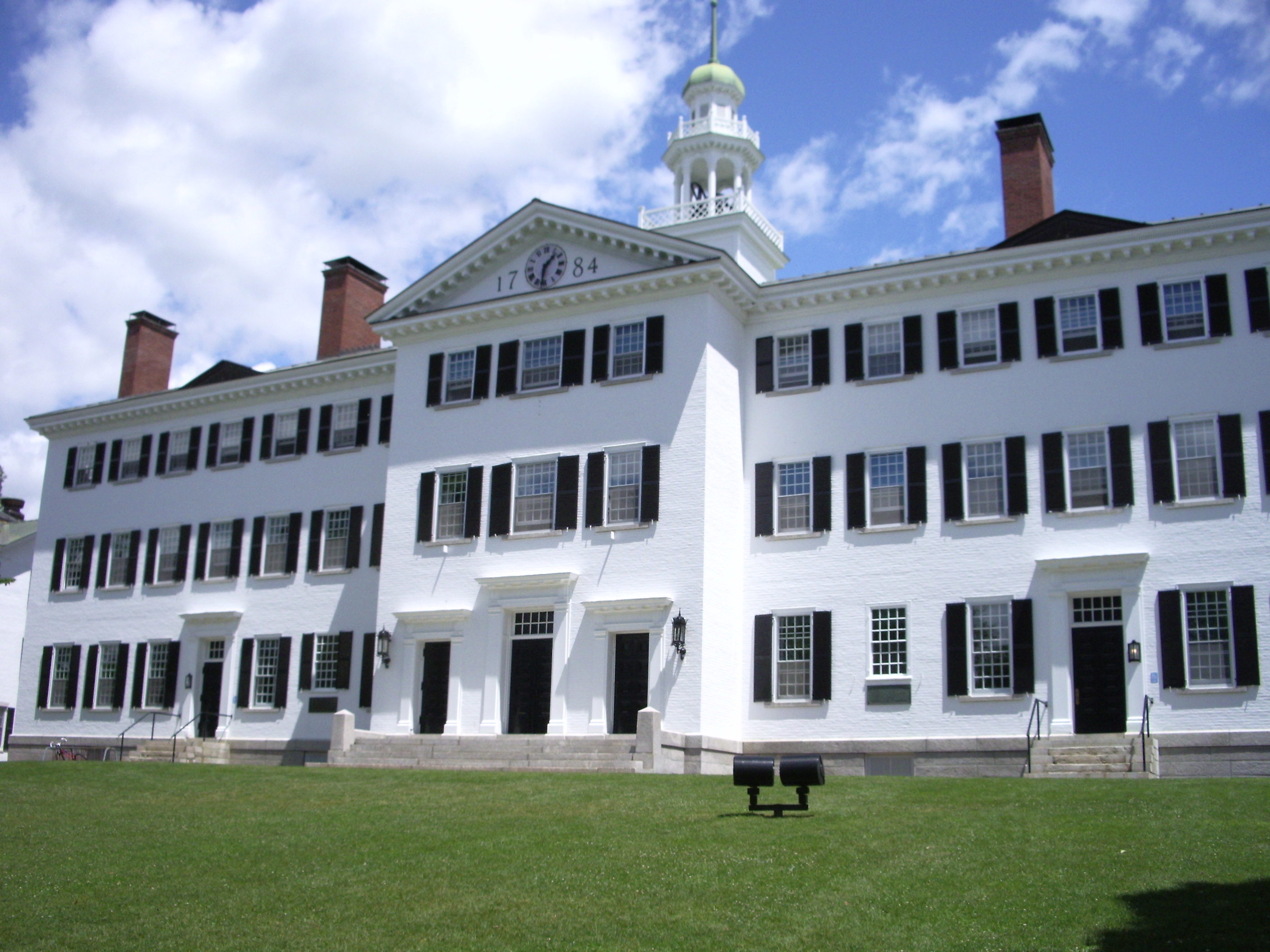
Dartmouth Hall at Dartmouth College

Rosenstock-Huessy encountered strong opposition at Harvard University to the presentation of his ideas in social history and other topics, all of which were based on his Christian faith. Reportedly, Rosenstock-Huessy frequently mentioned God in class. He also often attacked non-religious academic thinking, a teaching tradition assumed by the Harvard faculty to be a prerequisite for high scholarship. Profound differences of opinion ensued and led, in 1935, to his accepting an appointment as professor of social philosophy at Dartmouth College in Hanover, New Hampshire. He made his home in nearby Norwich, Vermont. He taught at Dartmouth until his retirement in 1957.

At Harvard, he had made friends there who helped him in his publishing efforts. His first major writing task was to develop an English-language revision of his earlier book on revolutions, and he soon published Out of Revolution: Autobiography of Western Man in 1938. George Allen Morgan, a former Harvard student under Alfred North Whitehead and himself the author of the classic What Nietzsche Means, subsequently assisted Rosenstock-Huessy in the preparation of The Christian Future or the Modern Mind Outrun in 1946. Further, Whitehead had strongly supported Rosenstock-Huessy in his disagreements with members of the Harvard faculty.

=== Renewed labor education ===
In 1940 he presented a request to US President, Franklin Delano Roosevelt, and was granted approval to organize a youth training program for the Civilian Conservation Corps (CCC). Eleanor Roosevelt and journalist Dorothy Thompson were champions of the proposal. He then founded Camp William James in Tunbridge, Vermont as a prototype for a national peacetime volunteer labor service. "Involving mainly students from Dartmouth, Radcliffe, and Harvard, its purpose was to train young leaders to expand the 7-year-old CCC from a program for unemployed youth into a work service program that would accept volunteers from all walks of life." The entrance of the United States into World War II in 1941 ended this and all other CCC programs because men were needed in the armed services and women became a greater part of the workforce. This concept anticipated the Peace Corps by more than two decades.

=== Publications, 1933–1973 ===
Book cover for Multiformity of Man

Book cover for Out of Revolution

Book cover for The Origin of Speech

Rosenstock-Huessy published Out of Revolution: Autobiography of Western Man in 1938, an English-language revision of his earlier book on revolutions. Together with George Allen Morgan, he published The Christian Future or the Modern Mind Outrun in 1946. In Out of Revolution, Rosenstock-Huessy wrote:

The present time is bound (...) to attempt an organization of future society by which the dynamite of revolution may be manipulated as persistently and consciously as contractors use real dynamite in building tunnels or roads.

During 1956 through 1958, Rosenstock-Huessy developed the principle of metanomics in his two-volume Soziologie (Sociology)—Volume I: On the Forces of Common Life (When Space Governs) and Volume II: On the Forces of History (When the Times Are Obeyed). During 1963 through 1964, he further developed this principle in Volumes I & II of, Die Sprache des Menschengeschlechts: Eine Leibhaftige Grammatik in Vier Teilen (The Speech of Mankind: A Personal Grammar in Four Parts). Whereas Soziologie is unavailable in English, Rosenstock-Huessy's Speech and Reality is an English-language introduction to that work. A collection of his writings, I Am an Impure Thinker offers a good overview of Rosenstock-Huessy's thought processes.

== Transitions ==
Rosenstock-Huessy's wife, Margrit, died in 1959. In 1960, Freya von Moltke became Rosenstock-Huessy's companion. She was the widow of Helmuth James von Moltke, who had opposed National Socialism and was executed by the Nazis.

After World War II and continuing through his retirement from Dartmouth, Rosenstock-Huessy was a frequent guest professor at many universities in Germany and the United States. He remained active in lecturing and writing until his final years. His output comprises more than 500 essays, articles, and monographs, as well as 40 books. He was awarded an honorary doctoral degree in 1958 at the University of Münster. Rosenstock-Huessy died on February 24, 1973. He and his wife are buried at the Hillside Cemetery in Norwich, Vermont.

== Quotations ==
- "The French Revolution first introduced into Europe the notion of the tissue-paper frontier. Hitherto, all boundaries had been marshes, forests, mountains, dikes; that is to say, significant boundaries. But when boundaries can be drawn on paper, they need have no more significance than the stroke of a pen or a piece of chalk."
- "Grammar and logic free language from being at the mercy of the tone of voice. Grammar protects us against misunderstanding the sound of an uttered name; logic protects us against what we say having a double meaning."
- "He who believes in nothing still needs a girl to believe in him."

== Select bibliography ==
=== References ===
- van der Molen, Lise, ed. (1983). A complete bibliography of the writings of Eugen Rosenstock-Huessy. New York: E. Mellen Press. ISBN 088946748X.

=== In English ===
- Hans Ehrenberg, Franz Rosenzweig and Eugen Rosenstock (Sons for Peace), "Ways of Peace, Lights of Peace", Vol 1 & 2, (Rome: Vatican Press, 1910, New York: Bible Society, 1910).
- Rosenstock-Huessy, Eugen (1935), "The Predicament of History", Journal of Philosophy, 32 (4), Journal of Philosophy, Inc.: 93–100, doi:10.2307/2016606, JSTOR 2016606, archived from the original on 2007-11-30.
- Rosenstock-Huessy, Eugen; Rosenzweig, Franz (2011) [1935], Judaism Despite Christianity: The Wartime Correspondence Between Eugen Rosenstock-Huessy and Franz Rosenzweig, Chicago: University of Chicago Press, ISBN 978-0-226-72801-8.
- Rosenstock-Huessy, Eugen (1975), Magna Carta Latina, Pittsburgh: The Pickwick Press.
- Rosenstock-Huessy, Eugen (1973), Multiformity of Man, Norwich, Vermont: Argo Books, ISBN 0-912148-06-3, archived from the original on 2007-12-26.
- Rosenstock-Huessy, Eugen (1978), The Fruit of Lips, or, Why Four Gospels?, Pittsburgh: The Pickwick Press, archived from the original on 2007-11-30.
- Rosenstock-Huessy, Eugen; translation: Mark Huessy and Freya von Moltke (1978), Planetary Service. A Way into the Third Millennium, Norwich, Vermont: Argo Books, archived from the original on 2007-11-30.
- Rosenstock-Huessy, Eugen (1981), The Origin of Speech, Norwich, Vermont: Argo Books, ISBN 0-912148-13-6, archived from the original on 2007-12-26.
- Rosenstock-Huessy, Eugen; Translation: Mark Huessy and Freya von Moltke (1988), Practical Knowledge of the Soul, Norwich, Vermont: Argo Books, archived from the original on 2007-11-30.
- Rosenstock-Huessy, Eugen (1993), Out of Revolution: Autobiography of Western Man (2 ed.), Providence and Oxford: Berg Publishers, Inc., ISBN 0-912148-05-5, archived from the original on 2007-12-26.

=== In German ===
- Rosenstock-Huessy, Eugen (1910), Herzogsgewalt und Friedensschutz, Breslau: M & H Marcus.
- Rosenstock-Huessy, Eugen (1916), Angewandte Seelenkunde, Darmstadt: Röther-Verlag.
- Rosenstock-Huessy, Eugen (1916), Briefwechsel mit Franz Rosenzweig, Berlin: Schocken-Verlag.
- Rosenstock-Huessy, Eugen (1920), Die Tochter, Mössingen-Talheim: Talheimer-Verlag.
- Rosenstock-Huessy, Eugen (1922), Werkstattaussiedlung—Untersuchungen über den Lebensraum des Industriearbeiters, Berlin: Julius Springer Verlag, ISBN 3-87067-629-9.
- Rosenstock-Huessy, Eugen (1926–30), Die Kreatur—Eine Zeitschrift, Berlin: Verlag Lambert-Schneider.
- Rosenstock-Huessy, Eugen (1951), Der Atem des Geistes, Frankfurt am Main: Verlag der Frankfurter Hefte.
- Rosenstock-Huessy, Eugen (1957), Frankreich – Deutschland. Mythos oder Anrede?, Berlin: Käthe-Vogt-Verlag.
- Rosenstock-Huessy, Eugen (1957), Zurück in das Wagnis der Sprache, Berlin: Käthe-Vogt-Verlag.
- Rosenstock-Huessy, Eugen (1958), Das Geheimnis der Universität, Stuttgart: Kohlhammer-Verlag.
- Rosenstock-Huessy, Eugen (1958), Die Gesetze der Christlichen Zeitrechnung, Münster: Agenda-Verlag.
- Richter, Christoph (2007), Im Kreuz der Wirklichkeit—Die Soziologie der Räume und Zeiten von Eugen Rosenstock-Huessy, vol. Reihe 22: Soziologie Vol. 418 (Europäische Hochschulschriften ed.), Frankfurt am Main, Berlin, Bern, Bruxelles, New York, Oxford, Wien: Peter Lang, ISBN 978-3-631-55773-0.
- Rosenstock, Eugen (1925), Soziologie I. Die Kräfte der Gemeinschaft, Berlin and Leipzig: Walter de Gruyter & Co., archived from the original on 2007-11-30.
- Picht, Werner; Rosenstock, Eugen (1926), "Im Kampf um die Erwachsenenbildung, 1912-1926", in von Erdberg, Robert (ed.), Schriften für Erwachsenenbildung. Im Auftrag der Deutschen Schule für Volksforschung und Volksbildung, Bd. 1, Leipzig: Verlag Quelle und Meyer, archived from the original on 2007-11-30.
- Rosenstock, Eugen (1926), Lebensarbeit in der Industrie und Aufgaben einer europäischen Arbeitsfront, Berlin: Julius Springer, archived from the original on 2007-11-30.
- Rosenstock, Eugen (1926), Religio Depopulata. Zu Joseph Wittigs Ächtung, Berlin: Verlag Lambert Schneider, archived from the original on 2007-11-30.
- Rosenstock, Eugen (1926), Vom Industrierecht. Rechtssystematische Fragen. Festgabe für Xaver Gretener, Berlin: H. Sack, archived from the original on 2007-11-30.
- Rosenstock, Eugen (1927), "Die Deutsche Schule für Volksforschung und Erwachsenenbildung. Das erste Jahr", in Theodor Bäuerle; Robert von Erdberg; Wilhelm Flitner; Walter Hoffmann; Eugen Rosenstock (eds.), Hohenrodter Bund, Stuttgart: Verlag Silberburg GmbH, archived from the original on 2007-11-30.
- Rosenstock, Eugen; Wittig, Joseph (1928), Das Alter der Kirche. Kapitel und Akten .3 Bände, Berlin: Verlag Lambert Schneider, archived from the original on 2007-11-30.
- Rosenstock, Eugen (1929), Politische Reden--Vierklang aus Volk, Gesellschaft, Staat und Kirche, Berlin: Verlag Lambert Schneider, archived from the original on 2007-11-30.
- Rosenstock-Huessy, Eugen (1952), Heilkraft und Wahrheit. Konkordanz der politischen und der kosmischen Zeit, Stuttgart: Evangelisches Verlagswerk GmbH, archived from the original on 2007-11-30.
- Rosenstock-Huessy, Eugen (1965), Dienst auf dem Planeten--Kurzweil und Langeweile im dritten Jahrtausend, Stuttgart, Berlin, Köln, Mainz: Kohlhammer Verlag, GmbH, archived from the original on 2007-11-30.

== See also ==
- List of American philosophers
- List of peace activists

== Sources ==
=== Primary ===
- Rosenstock-Huessy, Eugen (1936), The Multiformity of Man—Economics of a Mechanized World, Norwich, Vermont: Beachhead, archived from the original on 2007-11-30.
- Rosenstock, Eugen (1914), Königshaus und Stämme in Deutschland zwischen 911 und 1250, Leipzig: Felix Meiner, archived from the original on 2007-11-30.
- Rosenstock, Eugen (1920), Die Hochzeit des Kriegs und der Revolution, Würzburg: Patmos-Verlag, archived from the original on 2007-11-30.
- Rosenstock, Eugen (1921), "Angewandte Seelenkunde", Die Arbeitsgemeinschaft 4, Monatsschrift für das gesamte Volkshochschulwesen, 4: 129–146, archived from the original on 2007-11-30.
- Rosenstock, Eugen; Wittig, Joseph (1928), Das Alter der Kirche. Kapitel und Akten .3 Bände, Berlin: Verlag Lambert Schneider, archived from the original on 2007-11-30.
- Rosenstock-Huessy, Eugen (1931), Die Europäischen Revolutionen. Volkscharaktere und Staatenbildung, Jena: Eugen Diederichs Verlag, archived from the original on 2007-11-30.
- Rosenstock-Huessy, Eugen (1938), Out of Revolution: Autobiography of Western Man, New York: William Morrow & Co., archived from the original on 2007-11-30.
- Rosenstock-Huessy, Eugen (1951), Die Europäischen Revolutionen und der Charakter der Nationen, Moers: Brendow Verlag, archived from the original on 2007-11-30.
- Rosenstock-Huessy, Eugen (1956), Soziologie, Bd. 1, Die Übermacht der Räume, Stuttgart, Berlin, Köln, Mainz: W. Kohlhammer Verlag, archived from the original on 2007-11-30.
- Rosenstock-Huessy, Eugen (1958), Soziologie, Bd. 2, Die Vollzahl der Zeiten, Stuttgart: W. Kohlhammer Verlag, archived from the original on 2007-11-30.
- Rosenstock-Huessy, Eugen (1963), Die Sprache des Menschengeschlechts—Eine leibhaftige Grammatik in vier Teilen, Bd. 1, Erster und Zweiter Teil, Heidelberg: W. Kohlhammer Verlag, archived from the original on 2007-11-30.
- Rosenstock-Huessy, Eugen (1964), Die Sprache des Menschengeschlechts—Eine leibhaftige Grammatik in vier Teilen, Bd. 2, Dritter und Vierter Teil, Heidelberg: W. Kohlhammer Verlag, archived from the original on 2007-11-30.
- Rosenstock, Eugen; Rosenzweig, Franz (1969), Rosenstock-Huessy, Eugen (ed.), Judaism despite Christianity—The letters on Christianity and Judaism between Rosenstock-Huessy and Franz Rosenzweig, University, Alabama: University of Alabama Press, archived from the original on 2007-11-30.*Rosenstock-Huessy, Eugen (1970a), Speech and Reality, Norwich, Vermont: Argo Books, ISBN 0-912148-02-0, archived from the original on 2007-12-26.
- Rosenstock-Huessy, Eugen (1970b), I Am an Impure Thinker, Norwich, Vermont: Argo Books, ISBN 0-912148-56-X, archived from the original on 2007-12-26.
- Rosenstock-Huessy, Eugen (1981), The Origin of Speech, Norwich, Vermont: Argo Books, ISBN 0-912148-13-6, archived from the original on 2007-12-26.

=== Secondary ===
- Argo Books, Inc. (1999), Eugen Rosenstock-Huessy (1888-1973), archived from the original on 2007-11-30.
- Auden, W.H.; Kronenberger, Louis (1966), The Viking Book of Aphorisms, New York: Viking Press
- Cristaudo, Wayne (2008), "Eugen Rosenstock-Huessy", in Zalta, Edward N. (ed.), The Stanford Encyclopedia of Philosophy, Palo Alto
- Daimler-Benz AG, Eugen (1991), Rosenstock (ed.), Daimler Werkzeitung 1919/20, Moers: Joh. Brendow & Sohn Verlag, archived from the original on 2007-11-30.
- McDuffee, Mike (November 2004), An Introduction to the Christian Thought of Eugen Rosenstock-Huessy: The Strange Catechism of the Christian Future, Evangelical Theological Society
- Rosenzweig, Franz (1914–1929), The Gritli Letters, archived from the original on 2007-09-16.
- Smith, Page (1990), Killing the Spirit: Higher Education in America, New York: Viking, archived from the original on 2007-11-30.
- von Moltke, Freya; Huessy, Francis; Stahmer, Harold M. (1999), Eugen Rosenstock-Huessy (1888-1973)—A Brief Biography.
