= Page Smith =

U.S. historian, professor, author, and newspaper columnist

Page Smith (September 6, 1917 – August 28, 1995) was an American historian, professor and author. In 1964 he became the founding Provost of Cowell College at University of California, Santa Cruz and resigned from the university in 1973 in protest. As an activist, he was a lifelong advocate for homeless people, for community organization, and for improving the prison system.

He served in the United States Army during World War II, for which he received a Purple Heart. He was awarded his Ph.D. from Harvard University in 1951 under the direction of Samuel Eliot Morison. Page Smith died in August 1995, one day after the death of his beloved wife, Eloise Pickard Smith.

== Early life ==
A native of Baltimore, Maryland, Smith graduated with a B.A. degree from Dartmouth College in 1940. At Dartmouth, he studied under historian Eugen Rosenstock-Huessy, a Dartmouth College professor. He then worked at Camp William James, a center for youth leadership training opened in 1940 by Rosenstock-Huessy as part of the Civilian Conservation Corps.

== World War II ==
Smith was drafted into the United States Army during World War II. Serving as a company commander with the 10th Mountain Division, he was deployed to Italy. He was awarded a Purple Heart after he was wounded in battle.

== Career ==
After World War II, he studied American history under Samuel Eliot Morison at Harvard College, receiving his M.A. degree in 1948, and Ph.D. degree in 1951. Pursuing his graduate studies at Harvard, he explains in Killing the Spirit how he struggled against certain figures in History departments in ways akin to those that had plagued his mentor, Rosenstock-Huessy throughout his own career. Rosenstock-Huessy, he explained, was a contentious figure in many History departments, whose ideas he suggested posed a threat to existing conventions in that field. These experiences and the career of his teacher would reverberate in sculpting Smith throughout his metamorphosis as a scholar and as a civic leader.

After receiving his doctorate, Smith began work as a research associate at the Institute of Early American History and Culture in Williamsburg, Virginia in 1951. He then taught history at the College of William and Mary in Williamsburg. From 1953 to 1964, he was a professor of history at UCLA. In 1964, he became the founding provost of Cowell College, the first college of the University of California, Santa Cruz (UCSC). He taught history at UCSC until 1973.

For the years leading up to 1973, an issue had arisen on campus surrounding a decision of whether his friend and colleague Paul Lee would be granted tenure. He explains in his work Founding Cowell College a conversation he had with the founding chancellor Dean McHenry where McHenry noted the atmosphere surrounding Lee after a class as notably filled with "enthusiastic and excited students". Lee, however, seemed to Smith to have accumulated enough opponents in senior professorships throughout UCSC that his tenure track would ultimately be ill-fated. Smith recounts in detail his painstakingly going around to first the Philosophy Department, which had "closed its ranks to Paul", based on colleague Maurice Natanson's intense dislike of Lee, most likely based largely on Lee (as a junior faculty member) choosing to state disagreement with a Natanson appointment to the university, Albert Hofstadter. Next, he went to UCSC's Religious Studies department, as Lee's teaching style was a closer fit to theology anyway, his having been a teaching assistant of influential theologian Paul Tillich and a friend of religious scholar Huston Smith, who he infamously participated in the marsh chapel experiment with. However, Smith explains the ongoing conversations with Joe Barber in Religious Studies found Barber not budging on finding Lee a position, with the added oddity of Barber experiencing consistent Freudian mental slips throughout their discussions and calling Page "Paul" throughout his conversations with him. Then he went to Crown College, where both general faculty and students had voted to give Lee an appointment. Kenneth Thimann at Crown was fond of both Smith and Lee, but Thimann carried the message that the tenured faculty had subsequently voted quite substantially against Lee's appointment. Smith explains that this was most likely centered around Alan Chadwick's Chadwick Garden on campus and Paul Lee's role in starting it. The garden was infamous as a beginning catalyst for the organic movement and for its mystical and poetic atmosphere, which Smith explains many at Cowell were of the opinion had undermined the scientific seriousness of UCSC as an institution. He went to two other departments and had similarly found himself stymied. Then he sought the support of the "Fellowship Committee" and one of its members said they would resign if Lee was appointed. Another person then took that same stance. He explains that the senior leadership in the college did not want to "split the staff" with what was clearly such a contentious issue. Finally, he recounts, when one of the senior staff remarked that he himself would resign if Lee was appointed,

I didn’t say it to him. I thought—well then I’ll resign. I mean, I had identified myself with Paul’s cause; I believe[d] he should be kept. I believe[d] the grounds on which he was being terminated were wrong. And I [felt I] really should stand by him. And so shortly after that I told Paul that I thought the cause was lost, that I was announcing my resignation on these grounds that I then described in my letter to the faculty. So that’s it very briefly. In a certain sense it was a funny time too, you know, we explored the terrain. At every point, Paul had intractable enemies, people who felt so strongly, were so hostile to him, that they wouldn’t abide by any sort of group decision. That was really I think the heart of the matter.

— Founding Cowell College, 93

Smith then resigned from the university. He recounts this episode in detail in one of his seminal works Killing the Spirit: Higher Education in America. In this work, he describes the apostasy of institutional educational figures from their primary duty to teach students and their skewed focus on a publish or perish paradigm.

In a closing remark on his resignation, we hear,

Calciano: Some people probably thought that you had decided to go out in a blaze of glory.

Smith: You know that’s interesting. Two elements were involved and could be explanations. One, that people didn’t want to consider the real reason and two, that it was quixotic and in that sense nothing could be accomplished by that. [inaudible] So I suppose it’s not surprising when you think about it

Calciano: Also people were very surprised that I think you made such an issue of Lee and the publish-or-perish thing when you were a man who had published right along.

Smith: But I’ve always said at the same time that I was publishing that I was completely out of sympathy with that as a standard for retention on the faculty of any university and I have written articles about it. In the letter I wrote announcing the reasons for my resignation, I quoted a letter that I had written to the faculty several years earlier on the same subject. I could have made reference to an article that I had written eight or . . .well, ten years ago. So this wasn’t a new principle with me. I’ve always felt that way. But this time it was a case that seemed to me very important and was close to me personally. One person said to Paul Lee that I was just a sorehead, that I quit because I was mad and didn’t get my own way. I suppose there’s something in that, too. If I’d gotten my own way I wouldn’t have quit.

— Founding Cowell College, 94-95

Both before and after his resignation Smith was intellectually active as a scholar, author, and columnist. He wrote more than 20 books, including a biography of John Adams that won the 1963 Bancroft Prize, and an eight-volume A People's History of the United States.

After leaving the University of California, Santa Cruz, Smith and Lee held free, weekly, round-table lectures on American History at the Caffe Pergolessi in downtown Santa Cruz. The lectures were part of an ad-hoc series of lectures named Penny U because entrance cost one penny, a coffee-house tradition dating back to 17th Century London. Penny U still gathers as of 2022.

== Activism ==
Smith and Lee started the William James Association upon leaving institutional academia. William James wrote The Moral Equivalent of War, which centers around a civic call to voluntary work service during peace time. Taking cues from this and from his own time in Rosenstock Huessy's Camp William James Smith, along with Lee, sought to reestablish the spirit that was at work in the Civilian Conservation Corps. Then California Governor Jerry Brown met Smith and Lee. Brown was inspired by their exodus from UCSC and along with them found inspiration in the civic call to voluntary work services embraced by Camp William James and the similar effort signified by the original Civilian Conservation Corps. With these influences, Brown set forth the impetus to start the California Conservation Corps, which has been active as of 2022 as an environmental service department in the State of California and holds the motto "Hard Work, Low Pay, Miserable Conditions and More!" Around that same time in the late 1970s Brown also selected Smith's wife, Eloise Pickard Smith, as the first Director of his newly formed California Arts Council, which as of 2022 has a standing and continuing history as a major department within the State of California.

Smith worked as a community activist for homeless people in Santa Cruz. The William James Association in Santa Cruz helped establish a homeless shelter. It also offered work options for unemployed individuals. The Association was instrumental as well in the beginning of the Homeless Garden Project. The William James Association as of 2022 is active and continuing the Prison Arts Project which is the continuation of Eloise Pickard Smith's California Prison Arts Project that she began when she was the director of the California Arts Council.

== Personal life ==
In 1942, Smith married Eloise Pickard (1921–1995). They were married for fifty-three years. Eloise died of kidney cancer two days before Smith's own death from leukemia at their home in Santa Cruz. Mary Holmes, a friend and colleague, said, "it's really like plants that are wrapped around each other. We couldn't even imagine the shape of a life he would have without her. Apparently he couldn't either." They had four children.

== Writings ==
- James Wilson (1956)
- John Adams [2 v.] (New York: Doubleday, 1962–1963)
- The Historian and History (1964)
- As A City Upon a Hill (1966)
- Daughters of the Promised Land (1970)
- The Chicken Book: Being an Inquiry into the Rise and Fall, Use and Abuse, Triumph and Tragedy of Gallus Domesticus (Boston: Little, Brown, 1975) [with Charles Daniel]
- Jefferson: A Revealing Biography (New York: American Heritage, 1976)
- A Letter from My Father: The Strange, Intimate Correspondence of W. Ward Smith to his son Page Smith (1976)
- A People's History of the United States [8 v.] (McGraw-Hill, 1976–1987)
- The Constitution: A Documentary and Narrative History (1978)
- Dissenting Opinions (1984)
- Killing the Spirit: Higher Education in America (New York: Viking, 1990)
- Rediscovering Christianity: A History of Modern Democracy and the Christian Ethic (New York: St. Martin's, 1994)
- Democracy on Trial: The Japanese-American Evacuation and Relocation in World War II (New York: Simon & Schuster, 1995)
