= Camp William James =

Camp William James was opened in 1940 by Dartmouth College professor, Eugen Rosenstock-Huessy, as a center for training youth for leadership in the Civilian Conservation Corps, which had been inaugurated in 1933 by Franklin Delano Roosevelt. It was located near Tunbridge, Vermont. Funding for the camp was withdrawn only a year after its founding, along with the rest of the CCC, following the attack on Pearl Harbor, which brought the United States into World War II.

The camp's namesake and inspiration was the pragmatic philosopher, William James, who delivered an influential address at Stanford University in 1906 with the title, "The Moral Equivalent of War". "A permanently successful peace-economy cannot be a simple pleasure-economy", James argued, "Martial virtues must be the enduring cement; intrepidity, contempt of softness, surrender of private interest, obedience to command, must still remain the rock upon which states are built." To devote oneself to these martial virtues in the service of others, taking up the menial tasks of society like an army at war for the sake of peace, is a force equal to war, James argued. Rosenstock-Huessy took up this theme, calling the young men who enlisted in the Camp program, "soldiers".

In 1945, Rosenstock-Huessy wrote in his book, The Christian Future:

Our peacemakers and planners must be supported by camps all over the globe, where youth, recruited from every town and village all over the globe, serves. This service must implement the global organization as the young must experience what the old are planning before the old can have any authority.

Among those who had joined the short-lived work at Camp William James was a Dartmouth student, Page Smith, who later became an important American historian at the University of California, Santa Cruz. While on the faculty at UCLA, in 1962, Smith wrote a letter to Hubert Humphrey proposing an international version of the Camp William James experiment in the "moral equivalent of war". Humphrey passed along the idea to the US President, John F. Kennedy, and by 1963, the Peace Corps was created.
