= Eloise Pickard Smith =

American artist and the first director of the California Arts Council

- Born: August 6, 1921; Durham, North Carolina
- Died: August 26, 1995; Santa Cruz, California
- Spouse: Page Smith
- Children: Anne Easley, Ellen Davidson, Eliot Smith, Carter Smith

Eloise Pickard Smith (August 6, 1921 – August 26, 1995) was an artist and the first director of the California Arts Council in 1976, appointed by its creator, then Governor Jerry Brown. In 1977 she visited the California Medical Facility to judge an art show of work by incarcerated artists there. She was so inspired by what she saw, that she established the California Arts in Corrections Program later that year along with her husband, historian Page Smith. She opened the first art gallery in 1966 on the University of California Santa Cruz's campus, which is now called The Eloise Pickard Smith Gallery.

California Arts in Corrections operates as a partnership between the California Department of Corrections and Rehabilitation (CDCR) and the California Arts Council. Initial funding for the project came from the William James Association, an organization founded by philosopher Paul Lee and Smith's husband Page, and she founded its Prison Arts Project which is also active as of 2022. In 2021, her artwork was the subject of an exhibition in the Eloise Pickard Smith Gallery at UCSC alongside artwork by incarcerated artists involved with the Prison Arts Project.

On August 26, 1995, Eloise Pickard Smith died from kidney cancer in her Santa Cruz home. Her husband, Page Smith, died within 36 hours. Their story of love through death was featured in a 1998 interview with their daughter, Ann Easly, and friend, John Dizikes, on This American Life. Mary Holmes, a friend and colleague, said, "it's really like plants that are wrapped around each other. We couldn't even imagine the shape of a life he would have without her. Apparently he couldn't either."
