= French intensive gardening =

Gardening method where plants are in smaller spaces

French intensive gardening also known as raised bed, wide bed, or French market gardening is a method of gardening in which plants are grown within a smaller space and with higher yields than other traditional gardening methods. The main principles for success are often listed as soil improvement, raised beds, close spacing, companion planting, succession planting and crop rotation. Originating in France, the practice is very popular among urban gardeners and small for-profit farming operations.

== History ==
Beginning in the 1500s in neighborhoods in and around Paris, market gardens, as they were then known, were lauded for their high yields and high return on investment during seasons that were often bad for typical growers. "Maraîchers" or market gardeners employed techniques of fermenting manure to warm the soil, building stone walls to keep the wind at bay, and planting crops together to produce high yields. The work of two French market gardeners, Moreau and Daverne, who wrote their "Manuel pratique de la culture maraîchère de Paris" in 1845, often referred to as "La Culture Maraîchère," in which they recorded their knowledge of the gardening techniques, is used as a reference for how the technique was traditionally practiced.

Popularity of the French intensive method reached a high in the late 1800s and early 1900s as it spread to England. In 1869, William Robinson is the first English speaker credited with writing about the technique in his book "The Parks and Gardens of Paris." However, the practice was not taken seriously until the popularization by Peter Kropotkin in his 1899 book "Fields, Factories and Workshops." Then, in the late 1960s and early 1970s, the French intensive method made its way to the United States, helped primarily by gardeners Alan Chadwick and John Jeavons. Chadwick, an English gardener, started the Garden Project, now UC Santa Cruz's upper garden, using the French intensive method in 1967. Jeavons expanded on Chadwick's work by writing the book "How to Grow More Vegetables," which adapted the French intensive method into a consumable and understandable medium for the American public.

== Establishment ==
=== Bed preparation ===
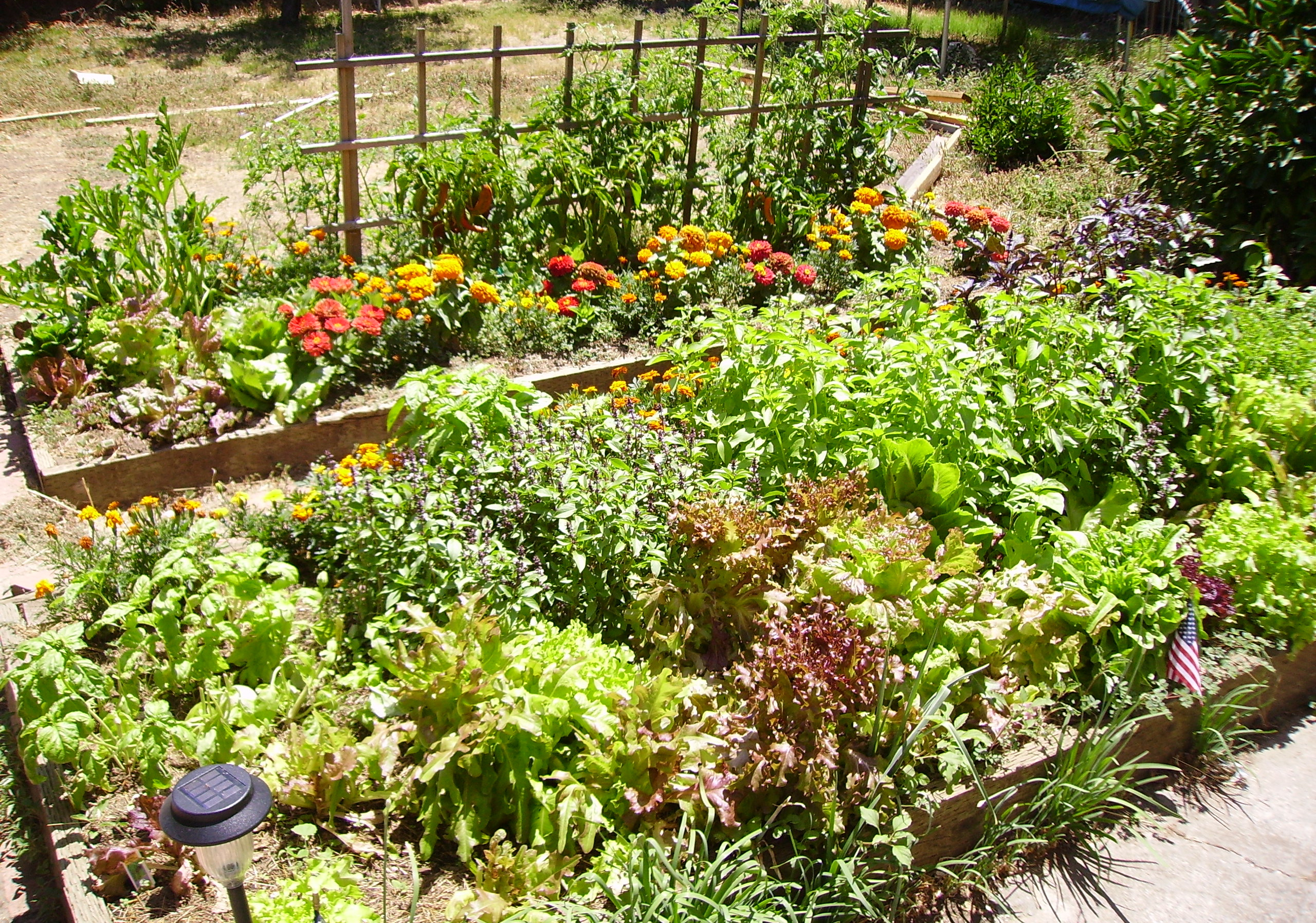
Raised bed planters, similar to those used in French Intensive Gardening

Bed preparation is an important and time-consuming activity that is vital to the success of a French intensive garden, beginning with the bed layouts which are often what people associate with the French intensive system. A 3x3 foot bed is the minimum size needed to create the micro climates necessary for successful planting, however most prefer a bed length of 5, 10, or 20 feet to make calculations easier and yields larger. Traditionally, raised beds are the first image to come to mind when thinking of a French intensive garden. However, bed heights should be adjusted to the climates they are being built in, with drier climates having flat or sunken to maximize water collection and wetter or temperate climates utilizing raised beds. Heights vary from 1–2 inches for warmer climates to 6–8inches in colder areas where soil heat needs to be conserved.

After the garden has been laid out, soil preparation is the next key aspect to consider for successful planting. Weeds and debris are removed from the beds and 3–4 inches of compost or manure is dug into the soil and left for a month in order to have nutrients spread around the soil; The process can be sped up by placing black or clear plastic tarps over the soil causing a pre-heating of the ground. Double-digging, is the technique often used to create well aerated and evenly dispersed nutrients in the soil. Proper soil preparation is key to aiding in plant growth using French intensive companion planting.

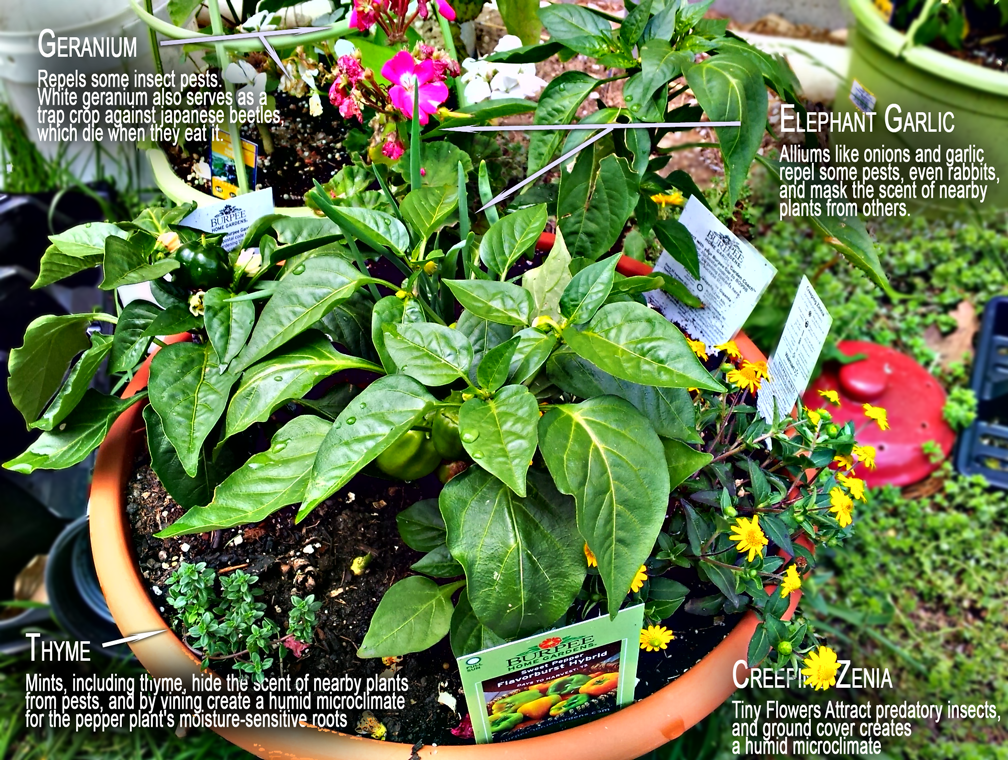
Companion planting using trap-cropping

=== Companion planting ===
French intensive gardening relies on companion planting to create the high volumes it is known for. Optimal spacing is achieved when the mature plants have their leaves barely brushing each other, creating a micro-canopy protecting the soil and keeping unwanted weeds at bay. Companion planting in French intensive gardening maximizes the amount of space in the bed used for planting, leaving little if any unused space and has three different forms, intercropping, trap-cropping, and companion planting. Each of the three forms involve growing two or more plants in close proximity so that they improve the growth of each other. Intercropping is most effective when it involves planting two plants of opposite needs or characteristics together; slow growing plants with faster ones, shorter rooted plant with longer rooted ones, taller plants with shorter ones. Trap-cropping involves planting flowering plants near growing produce to attract pollinating insects, and the third form, also known as companion planting, involves planting two or more crops together in order to improve flavors. Companion planting for flavor has limited scientific backing, unlike intercropping and trap-cropping.

== Modern applications ==
=== Adaptation for urban gardens and home gardeners ===
As a result of its signature small plots and minimal water usage, French intensive gardening is easily transitioned into successful method for dedicated urban and home gardeners. The lack of space afforded to individuals in cities or with small properties who wish to participate in gardening can adapt the French intensive method to their individual needs and produce similar harvests to gardeners with more space.

=== Small for-profit operations ===
Small for-profit gardening operations employ French intensive techniques. Companies such as SPIN, which stands for Small Plot INtensive, sell home growers manuals and how-to guides on producing for market.

== See also ==
- Biointensive agriculture
- Square foot gardening
