= Alan Chadwick =

- Born: July 27, 1909
- Died: May 25, 1980 (aged 70)
- Occupation: Master gardener
- Known for: Innovator of organic farming techniques and influential educator in the field of biodynamic/French intensive gardening.

Alan Chadwick (July 27, 1909 – May 25, 1980) an English master gardener, was a leading innovator of organic farming techniques and influential educator in the field of biodynamic/French intensive gardening. He was a student of Rudolf Steiner and is often cited as inspirational to the development of the "California cuisine" movement. The Chadwick restaurant in Beverly Hills was named after him. His grave is marked by a stupa at the Green Gulch Farm Zen Center in California. Chadwick is the subject of a 2013 retrospective by a former University of California, Santa Cruz, professor, Paul Lee, called There Is a Garden in the Mind: A Memoir of Alan Chadwick and the Organic Movement in California.

== See also ==
- Biointensive
- Biodynamic agriculture
- French intensive gardening
- Green Gulch Farm Zen Center
- Organic farming
