= John E. Ferling =

American historian (born 1940)

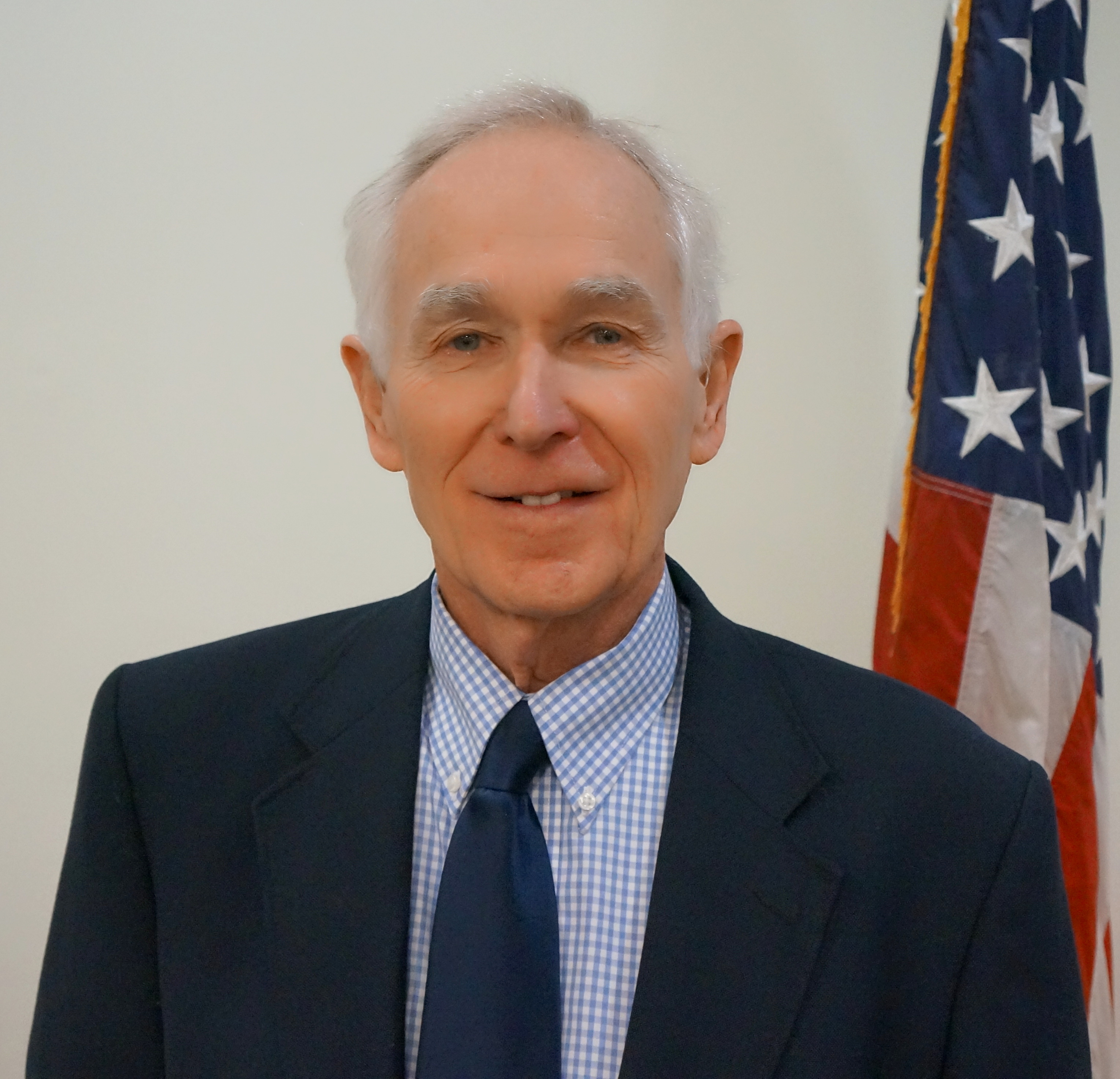
- Ferling in 2015
- Born: 1940 (age 85–86); Charleston, West Virginia, U.S.
- Other name: John Ferling
- Occupations: Historian, author, professor (retired 2004)
- Known for: American revolution historian
- Awards: Lifetime Achievement Award / Fraunces Tavern Book Award

John E. Ferling (born 1940) is a professor emeritus of history at the University of West Georgia. As a leading historian in the American Revolution and founding era, he has appeared in television documentaries on PBS, the History Channel, C-SPAN Book TV, and the Learning Channel.

== Biography ==
John Ferling was born in 1940 in Charleston, West Virginia. Ferling grew up in Texas City, Texas. Ferling attended Sam Houston State University, and later received a master's degree in history from Baylor University. He earned his Ph.D. in history from West Virginia University in 1971. John Ferling taught for 39 years, mostly at the University of West Georgia. Ferling retired from teaching to spend more time writing.

== Awards ==
- Lifetime Achievement Award
- Fraunces Tavern Book Award
- Outstanding Retired Faculty

== Publications ==
External videos
- Presentation by Ferling on Setting the World Ablaze, June 18, 2001, C-SPAN
- Booknotes interview with Ferling on Adams vs. Jefferson: The Tumultuous Election of 1800, October 3, 2004, C-SPAN
- Presentation by Ferling on Almost a Miracle, September 27, 2007, C-SPAN
- Presentation by Ferling on Independence, July 27, 2011, C-SPAN
- Presentation by Ferling on Jefferson and Hamilton, October 9, 2013, C-SPAN
- Presentation by Ferling on Whirlwind, May 4, 2015, C-SPAN
- Presentation by Ferling on Apostles of Revolution, May 30, 2018, C-SPAN
- Q&A interview with Ferling on Apostles of Revolution, August 19, 2018, C-SPAN

- Almost a Miracle: The American Victory in the War of Independence
- The Loyalist Mind: Joseph Galloway and the American Revolution
- A Wilderness of Miseries: War and Warriors in Early America
- The First of Men: A Life of George Washington
- Struggle for a Continent: The Wars of Early America
- John Adams: A Life
- Setting the World Ablaze: Washington, Adams, Jefferson, and the American Revolution
- A Leap in the Dark: The Struggle to Create the American Republic
- Adams vs. Jefferson: The Tumultuous Election of 1800
- The Ascent of George Washington: The Hidden Political Genius of an American Icon
- Independence: The Struggle to Set America Free (published June 21, 2011)
- Jefferson and Hamilton: "The Rivalry That Forged A Nation"*
- Whirlwind: the American Revolution and the War that Won It. Bloomsbury Press. 2015. ISBN 9781620401729.
- Apostles of Revolution: Jefferson, Paine, Monroe, and the Struggle Against the Old Order in America and Europe. 2018. ISBN 9781632862099.
- Winning Independence: The Decisive Years of the Revolutionary War, 1778–1781. 2021. ISBN 9781635572766.
- Shots Heard Round the World: America, Britain, and Europe in the Revolutionary War. 2025. ISBN 9781639730155.
