= Dean McHenry =

Dean E. McHenry (18 October 1910 – 17 March 1998) was an American professor of political science and the founding chancellor of the University of California, Santa Cruz.

McHenry was born in Lompoc, California, north of Santa Barbara. He earned his bachelor's degree in political science from UCLA in 1932, followed by a master's degree from Stanford University in 1933 and a Ph.D. from U.C. Berkeley in 1936.

McHenry taught government at Williams College and political science at Pennsylvania State College, and became a member of the faculty of political science at UCLA. During his time at UCLA, he ran for several political offices, including mayor of Los Angeles and for the United States Congress. He also authored numerous books.

In 1958, he became the academic assistant to his long-time friend Clark Kerr, the then-president of the University of California, and in 1960 he helped Kerr draft California's Master Plan for Higher Education. The following year, he became the first chancellor of the new University of California Santa Cruz, a position he held for 13 years.

McHenry and his wife, Jane, had four children, including the noted anthropologist Henry McHenry.
