= Soziologie =

Book by Eugen Rosenstock-Huessy

- Eugen Rosenstock-Huessy (1888-1973), German social philosopher. Photo courtesy of Marriot Huessy, Eugen Rosenstock-Huessy Fund
- Author: Eugen Rosenstock-Huessy
- Language: German
- Subject: Social philosophy
- Genre: Philosophy
- Publisher: Kohlhammer Verlag
- Publication date: 1956-1958
- Publication place: Germany
- Pages: In 3 volumes, hardbound, about 1050 pages
- ISBN: 3-89376-065-2

Soziologie is a 1956–1958 book by Eugen Rosenstock-Huessy (1888–1973), German social philosopher, addressing the spatial and temporal influences on “human life, language and associations. To Rosenstock-Huessy, speech is central to sociology; sociology must recognize that speech is the concrete form of social reality.” Although it is Rosenstock-Huessy’s most systematic work. His Soziologie, has never been translated into English. It is a work that he revised periodically throughout his adult life. The book has two volumes, Band I: Die Übermacht der Räume (Volume 1: Obsession with Spaces) and Band II: Die Vollzahl der Zeiten (Volume 2: The Full Count of Times). Peter Leithart writes on "The Relevance of Eugen Rosenstock-Huessy" and his methods:

It’s not only the scope that impresses, but the integration. There is a passionate religious impulse behind everything he wrote, and it’s all made immediately, existentially real. But he moves rapidly from the large movements of history down to individual and family experience.

== Overview ==
The two volumes are in three parts. In Part 1, Rosenstock-Huessy addresses the areas of existence in which people confront serious life, such as marriage or service in war. “He says that important human experiences like these are created by human powers like enthusiasm, love, or faith. He then contrasts these life-changing, deeply rooted experiences in time and space with the abstract concepts, space and time. He sees these human powers as the concrete forces which create timespans, and so create and structure history.” In Part 2, he treats history as one part of each person’s soul and thereby a major influence individuals’ actions. Recurring historical events and times constitute both people’s individual and combined experiences. In Part 3, he addresses people living together and how they create communities and social structures.
