= Cowell College =

Residential college of the University of California, Santa Cruz

Coordinates: 36.99714°N 122.05407°W

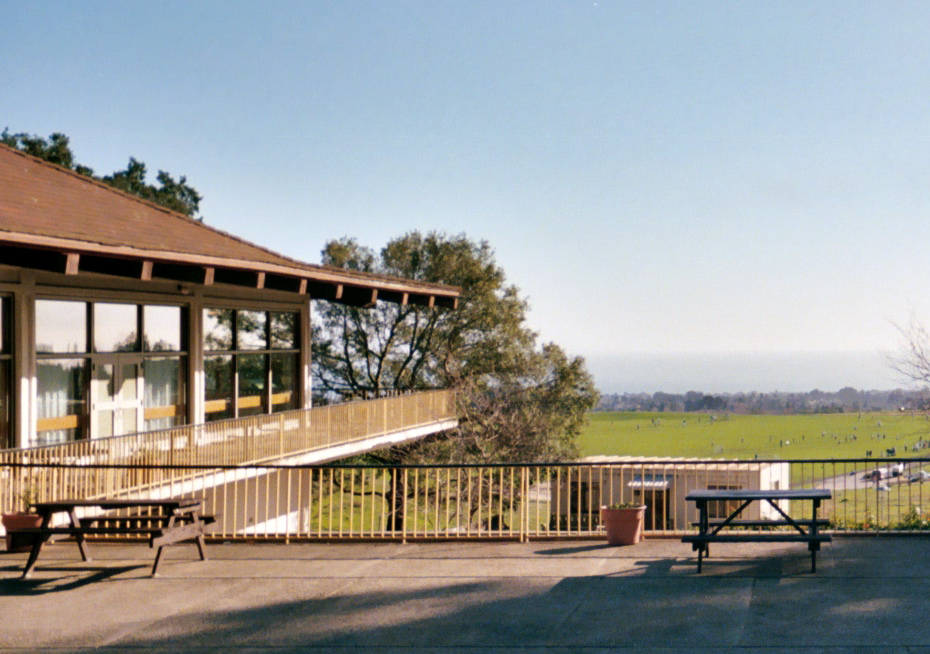
- Motto: The pursuit of truth in the company of friends
- Type: Residential college
- Established: 1965
- Provost: Alan Christy
- Undergraduates: 1498
- Location: University of California; 1156 High Street; Santa Cruz, CA 95064, Santa Cruz, California, United States
- Campus: Suburban/Sylvan
- Colors: UCSC Blue; UCSC Gold
- Website: www.cowell.ucsc.edu/

The first of the ten residential colleges of the University of California, Santa Cruz, established in 1965, Cowell College (Samuel Henry Cowell College) sits on the edge of a redwood forest with a remarkable view of Monterey Bay. The college is named for Henry Cowell and the Cowell family, who donated the land that UCSC is built upon, previously known as the Cowell Ranch.

== Living at Cowell ==
Cowell College features seven dormitory buildings which are named after American historians, and architecturally reminiscent of English schools. Each building houses between 45 and 95 students in two clusters known as Upper Quad and Lower Quad. The buildings are named as follows: Adams, Prescott, Parkman (upper quad); Beard, Parrington, Turner (lower quad); and Morison (though Morison's front entrance opens onto the lower quad, whether the dorm is upper or lower quad is a source of debate.) Three buildings of apartments opened in 2004. Each apartment houses six or seven students in several bedrooms that share a living room, kitchen, and bathrooms.

These residence halls and apartments have resident assistants that live in the buildings in order to offer some counseling, programming, and guidance to the students living in Cowell. There are two resident assistants for each dormitory and five resident assistants for the apartments.

In the past, another building known as La Maison Francophone housed approximately 15 students who met weekly to speak French, study French culture, and put on events for the college. This building, located behind the Humanities and Social Sciences complex, now houses mostly teachers and graduate students, in addition to the Soviet Apartment, a communal living experiment occupied by students of the Russian language course.

Topped by a glass cupola, Cowell's dining hall is one of Cowell's best known visible features and has become one of the College's icons. The dining hall serves as the primary eatery for Cowell and Stevenson College. This building was reopened following retrofitting during the 2008 school year.

== Cowell programs ==
Cowell also features a wide variety of annual events and programs. For example, residential staff has in the past hosted a series of events each year known as the Cowell Olympics. Teams of students from the two quads, or each individual building are pitted against each other for prizes, their house name on an official Cowell Olympics plaque, and most recently, a banner to hang from the building's balcony.

Along with college wide events, the Resident Assistants in the living areas are required to run 6 house events for each building every quarter. These can range from movie showings to nature trips to discussions on current events.

Cowell College also sponsors a UCSC a cappella group, Acquire. The group recently put on a large free show at Cowell called Acquirefest featuring all three on campus a cappella groups and some other guest groups. The event brought in over 400 people and has now become one of the school's largest music events of the year.

== Notable features ==
It is home to the Eloise Pickard Smith Gallery, named in honor of Eloise Pickard Smith, the wife of Cowell's first Provost, Page Smith. Cowell's library, housing a small private collection of books, and another popular study spot, is named in his honor. An unofficial 24-hour silent rule exists in this space. In addition, Cowell owns many sculptures displayed around its campus, including the Cowell fountain and a statue dedicated to students who died in the Vietnam War. Cowell is also known for beautiful wisteria plants that bloom in the spring around the college. Cowell also has glass display cases that are used to display student and class art work. They are curated by a UCSC student.

Dating from the days of the old ranch, Cowell houses a Printing Press. A course is offered that teaches students about book making.
