= Fritz Klatt =

German educational reformer and writer

- Born: 22 May 1888; Berlin, Germany
- Died: 26 July 1945 (aged 57); Vienna, Austria
- Occupation: Pedagogue
- Parent(s): Johannes Klatt, Margarete Klatt

Fritz Klatt (22 May 1888 – 26 July 1945) was a German educational reformer and writer.

== Life ==
Fritz Klatt was born on 22 May 1888 in Berlin, to Johannes Klatt, an Indologist. He studied history, pedagogy and philosophy in Berlin.

In the 1920s Klatt was one of the leaders of the German Youth Movement, especially involved in adult education and active leisure. In 1921 he founded a school in Prerow on the Darß peninsula in Pomerania, which the Nazis closed in 1933.

He thought traditional education overemphasized acquiring knowledge through repetition and obedience. He advocated "creative education" that would bring out what is already in the man to encourage their individual development. He attached great importance to community work and leisure activities to reduce stress and regenerate the creative forces. This included physical activities such as gymnastics, sports and dance.

Klatt wrote Die aufbauende Gemeinschaft ('The Constructive Society'), the tenth pamphlet in Hermann Schüller's series Der Aufbau: Flugblätter an Jugend ('The Edification: Pamphlets to the Youth'). He was also one of the contributors to the journal Die Kreatur (The Creature) co-founded in 1925 by Eugen Rosenstock-Huessy and edited by Joseph Wittig, Martin Buber, and Viktor von Weizsäcker, which lasted until 1930. The journal published writings by authors such as Nikolai Berdyaev, Lev Shestov, Franz Rosenzweig, Ernst Simon, Hugo Bergmann, Hans Ehrenberg and Rudolf Ehrenberg who were opposed to the dominant educational theory in Germany based on idealism, positivism, and historicism. From 1930 Klatt was co-editor of the Neue Blätter fūr den Socialismus ('New Pages for Socialism') with Eduard Heimann and Paul Tillich. In 1931 he was appointed professor at the Pedagogical Academy in Altona, Hamburg.

Fritz Klatt died on 28 July 1945 in Vienna.

== Selected works ==
- Jean Paul als Verkünder von Frieden und Freiheit (Jean Paul, bringer of peace and freedom), 1919
- Die schöpferische (Creativity), Pause, 1922
- Ja, nein und trotzdem. Gesammelte Aufsätze (Yes, no and yet. Collected essays), Jena: Eugen Diederichs Verlag, 1924
- Beruf und Bildung (Business and Education), 1929
- Freizeitgestaltung (Recreation), 1929
- Die geistige Wendung des Maschinenzeitalters (The spiritual change of the machine age), 1930
- Rainer Maria Rilke. Sein Auftrag in heutiger Zeit (Rainer Maria Rilke. His Mission today), Berlin: L. Schneider, 1936
- Hans Carossa: seine geistige Haltung und sein Glaubensgut, Wismar: H. Rhein, 1937
- Sieg über die Angst : die Weltangst des modernen Menschen und ihre Überwindung durch Ranier Maria Rilke (Defiance of Fear: the world-anxiety of modern man and how to overcome it according to Rainer Maria Rilke), Berlin: L. Schneider, 1940
- Lebensmächte: Gesetze der geistigen Entwicklung (Life powers: Laws of spiritual development), Jena: E. Diederich, 1939, p. 277
- Griechisches Erbe: Das Urbild der Antike im Widerschein des heutigen Lebens (Greek Heritage: The example of antiquity for modern life), Berlin: W. de Gruyter & Co, 1943
- Rainer Maria Rilke, Foreword by Lis Klatt, Vienna: Amandus-Edition, 1948, p. 276
- Sprache und Verantwortung (Language and Responsibility), Vienna: Amandus Verlag, 1960
- Biographische Aufzeichnungen (Biographical notes), 1965

== Sources ==
- Argo Books (1999), Eugen Rosenstock-Huessy (1888-1973), archived from the original on 2007-11-30
- Böhm, Winfried (1977), "Klatt, Fritz", Neue Deutsche Biographie, vol. 11
- Campbell, Joan (2014-07-14), Joy in Work, German Work: The National Debate, 1800-1945, Princeton University Press, ISBN 978-1-4008-6037-1
