= Concentrative movement therapy =

Concentrative movement therapy (CMT) is a psychotherapeutic method for group and individual therapy which is based on thought models stemming from psychodynamic psychotherapy and depth psychology. Taking as its point of departure the theory that perception is composed of sensation and experience (Viktor von Weizsäcker), CMT is interested in the conscious perception of the body in the "here and now" against the background of the individual life and learning story.

== General ==
Through the concentrative engagement with early levels of experience, memories are brought to life which appear in bodily expression as posture, movement and behaviour. Like the material which appears in dreams, subjective bodily experience also contains information which can extend back to preverbal times. Bodily movements or bodily contact call forth a patient's basic postures. Through the movement work the biographical material is made topical so that a correlation can be made between what a person has experienced and that person's life story. "The primary process-like level of experience and the secondary process-like level of spoken expression constitute a unity. Through this, speaking acquires the following meaning: What has been experienced is, in the act of being spoken of, conceptualized, and consequently brought to the levels of thought, association, reflection and communication. This is how the sensory-emotional is linked to the linguistic-cognitive cycle in the sense of V. v. Weizsäcker's Gestaltkreis.

When we speak of movement therapy, by movement we understand the following:

- To-move-oneself, the experience of movement includes a person's sensorimotor functions.
- To-be-moved, what internally moves and has been moved (affects and emotions).
- To-be-on-the-way, that means the person's developmental steps and his gradual progress in the overcoming of actual or fantasized external or internal impediments.

== Areas of application ==
Clinical patients and outpatients in individual or group therapy:

- Psychosomatics
- Early disturbances: narcissistic and borderline disturbances; in particular, body-schema and body-image disturbances
- Neurotic disturbances
- Illnesses resulting from addictions
- Crisis intervention
- Acute reaction to pressure
- Traumas
- Psychoses
- Morbid anxiety
- Compulsion disturbance
- Eating disorder
- Depression
- Chronic illnesses with pain
- Consciousness raising
- Adult education

== Theoretical basis and principles ==
CMT extracts a deepened understanding of human nature from the existence-philosophical formulation, which Gabriel Marcel articulates in the following way: "I have a body and am my body". "For us the body is not the entrance to what psychically happens, but is rather the place where the entirety of what happens psychically takes place."

CMT is theoretically based on Gabriel Marcel and Maurice Merleau-Ponty's existence philosophy, Piaget's genetic theory of knowledge, how he presents this in his development of the thought structures, in Viktor von Weizsäcker's medical anthropology (his theory of the Gestaltkreis) and in theories in depth psychology about ego development (A. Freud, Hartmann, Blanck and Blanck) and the object relationship (Balint, Mahler, Ericson, Winnicott, Kohut and Kernberg) and in the newer infant research (Lichtenberg, Stern, Sanders).

CMT's fundamental philosophical principles come from diverse sketches of the body-mind problematic in western philosophy. Up until today Descartes' dualism (body and mind as separate entities) marks our thinking. The transition from philosophy to psychology through Ehrenfels, Koffka and Köhler, the Gestalt psychologists, brought about the change to a unifying concept. In the field of philosophy, the phenomenologist and existence philosopher Gabriel Marcel made a significant contribution to the overcoming of the body-mind split with his "Etre et avoir" theory. He arrives at the formulation "I have a body and am my body" ("corp que j` ai et corps que je suis") as does Maurice Merleau-Ponty in his "Phenomenology of Perception": "One's own body is in the world the way that a heart is in an organism: The body is what keeps the entire visible spectacle alive; it innerly nourishes and fills one with life and builds a single system with the spectacle."

In his teachings about psychosomatic illnesses, V. v. Weizsäcker starts with psychophysical parallelisms and interaction theory and moves to his Gestaltkreis teachings; in these teachings he starts with the subjectivity of the perception process and with the notion that perception and movement are linked: "What prevails is a continual and reciprocal, self-illuminating, enclosed in-itself, bodily-mental back and forth, in cycle-like unity."

On the level of developmental psychology the Gestaltkreis teachings correspond to Jean Piaget's observances on the development of the early childhood structures of perception, attitude and thought. In continual assimilation and accommodation processes, the motor cognitive and the emotional development work together and determine each other. The development of the senses, the continually differentiating thought and comportment structures, and the experience of space and time are, for Piaget, the prerequisites for developing the ability to symbolize. Compatible with this are the theories of development in depth psychology, where the main emphasis is on early childhood experience with the people with whom one has relationships and where the condition for a healthy development is a happy relationship with the person to whom one relates most closely (Balint, Mahler, Ericson, Winnicott, Kohut and Kernberg).

"When in therapy it is about gaining more insight and awareness into oneself, language and thinking are needed. But language does not necessarily have to be the verbalization of contents; body language or the expression of one's own private language also helps. It is precisely those patients, who cannot verbally express their feelings and sensations, who more easily find in gesticulation, in symbolic expression about subjects or scenes, a first point of entry into their inner lives."

== History ==
The Munich physician and psychotherapist Helmut Stolze used the method in the university-clinical field and named it "Concentrative movement therapy" in 1958. From this moment on CMT was taught as a special method on congresses and was more and more represented in the psychotherapeutic practice.

== Literature ==
- Gräff, Ch.: „Konzentrative Bewegungstherapie in der Praxis," Hippokrates Verlag, Stuttgart, 1983
- Budjuhn, A.: „Die psycho-sozialen Verfahren. Konzentrative Bewegungstherapie und Gestaltungstherapie in Theorie und Praxis." Verlag modernes lernen, Dortmund, 1992
- Pokorny, V. & Hochgerner, M. & Cserny, S.: „Konzentrative Bewegungstherapie" Facultas Wien, 1996
- Bayerl, B.: „Konzentrative Bewegungstherapie bei chronisch schizophrenen Patienten – eine Kasuistik", in: Röhricht, Priebe, Körpererleben in der Schizophrenie, Hogrefe Verlag, Göttingen 1998
- Schreiber-Willnow, K.: „Körper-, Selbst- und Gruppenerleben in der stationären Konzentrativen Bewegungstherapie", Psychosozial-Verlag, Gießen 2000
- Gräff, Ch. & Maria L.: "Aus dem Tunnel der Depression. Ein Entwicklungsweg mit Konzentrativer Bewegungstherapie", Psychosozial-Verlag, Gießen, 2005
- K.P.Seidler, K.Schreiber-Willnow, A.Hamacher-Erbguth, M.Pfäfflin: "Die Praxis der Konzentrativen Bewegungstherapie(KBT): Frequenz - Dauer - Setting - Behandelte Störungsbilder", Springer Verlag, Berlin/Heidelberg, 2002
- S.Cserny & C.Paluselli: "Der Körper ist der Ort des psychischen Geschehens: praktisches Arbeits-Lehr-Buch für Konzentrative Bewegungstherapie", Verlag Königshausen & Neumann, Würzburg, 2006
