= Eduard Heimann =

German economist and social scientist

Eduard Magnus Mortier Heimann
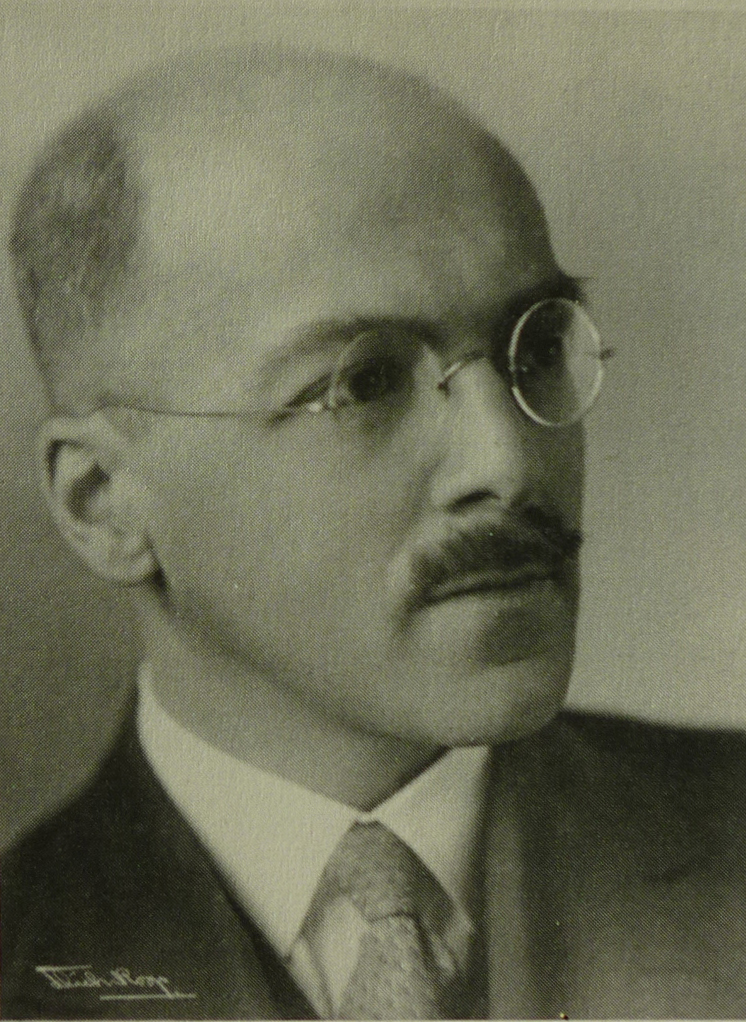
- Born: 11 July 1889; Berlin, Germany
- Died: 31 May 1967 (aged 77); Hamburg, Germany
- Occupations: Economist and social scientist

Eduard Magnus Mortier Heimann (11 July 1889 – 31 May 1967) was a German economist and social scientist who advocated ethical socialist programs in Germany in the 1920s and later in the United States. He was hostile to capitalism but thought it was possible to combine the advantages of a market economy with those of socialism through competing economic units governed by strong state controls.

== Life ==
Eduard Magnus Mortier Heimann was born in 1889. He came from a merchant family with Jewish origins. His father, Hugo Heimann was a publisher who served as a Social Democrat (SPD) member of the Berlin City Council, the Prussian House of Representatives and the National Parliament of the Weimar Republic, or Reichstag until 1932. Heimann studied economics under Franz Oppenheimer and Alfred Weber. He became a Christian Socialist.

Although Heimann was attracted to the German Youth Movement, he supported the SPD in the November Revolution of 1918. Early in 1919, the provisional government in Berlin made him general secretary of the Socialization Commission. In Easter 1923 Heimann spoke to a group of young socialists demonstrating against the French occupation of the Ruhr. He stressed the spiritual aspects of socialism in his speech. Heimann was a professor of theoretical and practical social economics at the University of Hamburg from 1925 to 1933.

In the 1920s, Heimann tried to convince the Social Democrats to follow an ethical socialist program of greatly expanded social programs and improvements to working conditions. From 1930 he was co-editor of the Neue Blätter fūr den Socialismus with Fritz Klatt and Paul Tillich. He deliberately used terms similar to those of the National Socialists in an effort to gain the support of the Mittelstand, but by confusing ethical socialism with Nazism he probably inadvertently advanced the cause of the Nazis. Heimann's books were among those banned and burned by the Nazis in 1933.

In 1933, Heimann emigrated with his family to the United States. He taught at The New School in New York City. The Fellowship of Socialist Christians was organized in the early 1930s by Reinhold Niebuhr and others with similar views. Later it changed its name to Frontier Fellowship and then to Christian Action. The main supporters of the Fellowship in the early days included Heimann, Paul Tillich, Sherwood Eddy and Rose Terlin. In its early days, the group thought capitalist individualism was incompatible with Christian ethics. Although not Communist, the group acknowledged Karl Marx's social philosophy.

Heimann returned to Hamburg in 1961. He died there in 1967. His descendants live in California (US) and in Israel.

== Views ==
Heimann's views diverged from Marxian economics and came close to Manchester Liberalism. Heimann published one of the first theoretical works on the "competitive solution" with his 1922 Mehrwert und Gemeinwirtschaft. The concept was that the socialist economy would be based on various monopolies or "trusts" supervised by the unions or the government, with a degree of competition between the trusts. He accepted the value of market pricing, but was committed to introducing a socialist system and had doubts about the compatibility of competition and socialism. His solution was "friendly competition" between various enterprises in the economy. The managers would compete, but would not be allowed to take profits or to abuse their monopoly. Prices would be based on costs. In 1929 Heimann told a conference of socialist intellectuals in Heppenheim that market economics and socialism were compatible in a strong state with a solid social policy. In 1930 he argued that the Soviet Union's destruction of the market mechanism had been a disastrous mistake. He said,

The Market is the motor force of the modern economy. Its destruction would be a leap into the void ... It is the historical task of socialism to abolish the anti-social tyranny of capitalism and to consolidate the economic achievements of capitalism. The foundation of all this, however, is the market relationship. The market is certainly not identical with capitalism. It would be just as silly to blame the field for becoming choked with weeds if one had not taken steps to avoid that happening, as it is to hold the market principle responsible for the fact that a market left unregulated will become overgrown by capitalism.

Heimann thought that the true goal of Karl Marx had been to restore the dignity of labor as opposed to abolishing private property. He did not believe that reducing hours of work was a useful goal, since the majority of people would fail to use leisure for creative activity. He thought that meaningful work was more rewarding for most people than passive leisure occupations. Heimann thought socialists should push for reforms to social policy and working conditions, and this would help replace the capitalist system with the new socialist order. In 1929 he explained the logic of the social-policy movement,

The social idea springs from the economic-social ground of capitalism, it takes form in the social movement and asserts itself with economic-social means within capitalism and against capitalism ... Social policy secures the capitalist basis of production against the dangers threatening from the social movement by yielding to the social demand; it dismantles capitalism piece by piece and in doing so preserves what is left; it achieves success when, and only when, the fulfillment of a piece of social demand becomes a necessity for production. This is its dual conservative–revolutionary nature.

== Selected works ==
Heimann's works included:

- Eduard Heimann, Soziale Theorie des Kapitalismus, 1929
- Eduard Heimann (1931), Kapitalismus, Organwirtschaft, Sozialpolitik und ihre theoretische Effassung, WWA
- Eduard Heimann (1931), Kapitalismus und Sozialismus
- Eduard Heimann (1932), Sozialistische Wirtschafts- und Arbeitsordnung
- Eduard Heimann (1934), Socialism and Democracy, Social Research
- Eduard Heimann (1934), Planning and the Market System, Social Research
- Eduard Heimann (1935), Types and Potentialities of European Planning, Social Research
- Eduard Heimann (1937), What Marx Means Today, Social Research
- Eduard Heimann (1938), Communism, Fascism or Democracy?
- Eduard Heimann (1938), The Revolutionary Situation of the Middle Classes, Social Research
- Eduard Heimann (1939), Building our Democracy, Social Research
- Heimann, Eduard (1941). "The Rediscovery of Liberalism". Social Research. 8 (4): 479–487. JSTOR 40981802.
- Eduard Heimann (1944), Franz Oppenheimer's Economic Ideas, Social Research
- History of Economic Doctrines: an introduction to economic theory. London, Toronto, New York: Oxford University Press. 1945.. Many times reprinted. Translated into Portuguese: 1965 as História das doutrinas econômicas (uma introdução à teoria econômica); (also reprinted).
- 1947: Freedom and order : lessons from the war. New York : Scribner's Sons. Reprinted 1993: Ann Arbor, Mich. : UMI.
- 1954: (in German) Wirtschaftssysteme und Gesellschaftssysteme. Tübingen : J.C.B. Mohr.
- Reason and faith in modern society : Liberalism, Marxism, and Democracy. Middletown, Conn: Wesleyan University Press. 1961. 2nd ed. 1962: Edinburgh : Oliver & Boyd.
- 1975: (in German) Sozialismus im Wandel der modernen Gesellschaft : Aufsätze zur Theorie und Praxis des Sozialismus : ein Erinnerungsband. published and with and introduction by Heinz-Dietrich Ortlieb. Berlin : Dietz.

== Sources ==
- Campbell, Joan (2014-07-14), Joy in Work, German Work: The National Debate, 1800-1945, Princeton University Press, ISBN 978-1-4008-6037-1
- Eduard Heimann, 1889-1967, New York: The New School, 2015, archived from the original on 2011-07-23
- Huerta de Soto, Jesús (2010-01-01), Socialism, Economic Calculation and Entrepreneurship, Edward Elgar Publishing, ISBN 978-1-84980-500-1
- Kaufmann, Franz-Xaver (2012-11-15), Thinking About Social Policy: The German Tradition, Springer Science & Business Media, ISBN 978-3-642-19501-3
- Nicholls, Anthony James (2000), Freedom with Responsibility: The Social Market Economy in Germany, 1918-1963, Clarendon Press, ISBN 978-0-19-820852-5
- Stone, Ronald H. (1992-01-01), Professor Reinhold Niebuhr: A Mentor to the Twentieth Century, Westminster John Knox Press, ISBN 978-0-664-25390-5
- Tobies, Renate (2012-01-05), Iris Runge: A Life at the Crossroads of Mathematics, Science, and Industry, Springer Science & Business Media, ISBN 978-3-0348-0251-2
