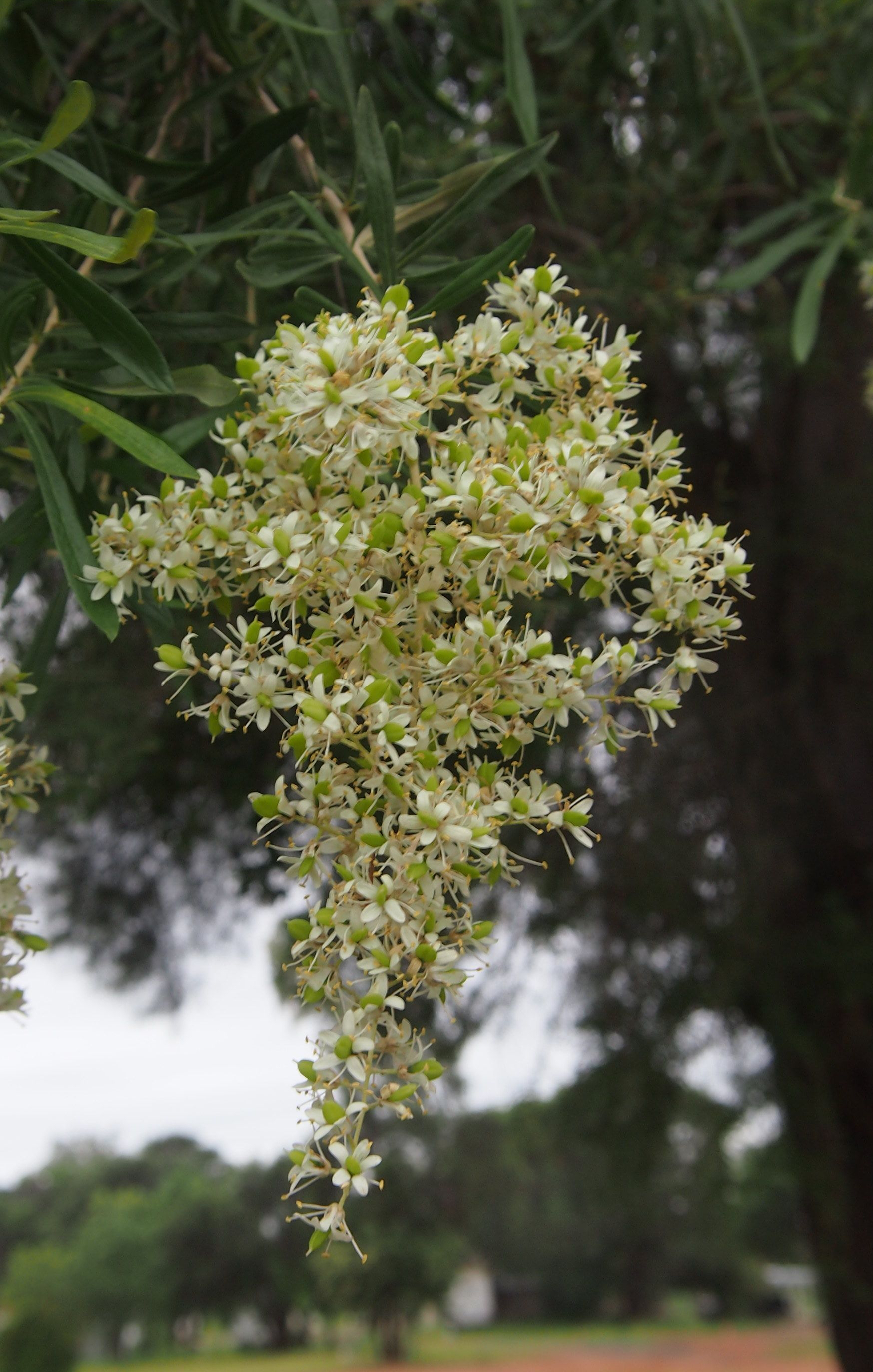
- Bursaria incana

Scientific classification
- Kingdom: Plantae
- Clade: Tracheophytes
- Clade: Angiosperms
- Clade: Eudicots
- Clade: Asterids
- Order: Apiales
- Family: Pittosporaceae
- Genus: Bursaria
- Species: B. incana

Binomial name
- Bursaria incana Lindl.

Synonyms
- Bursaria incana Lindl. var. incana; Bursaria incana var. septentrionalis E.M.Benn.; Bursaria spinosa var. incana (Lindl.) F.Muell. ex Klatt; Bursaria spinosa var. incana (Lindl.) Benth. nom. superfl.

= Bursaria incana =

Prickly pine

Species of plant

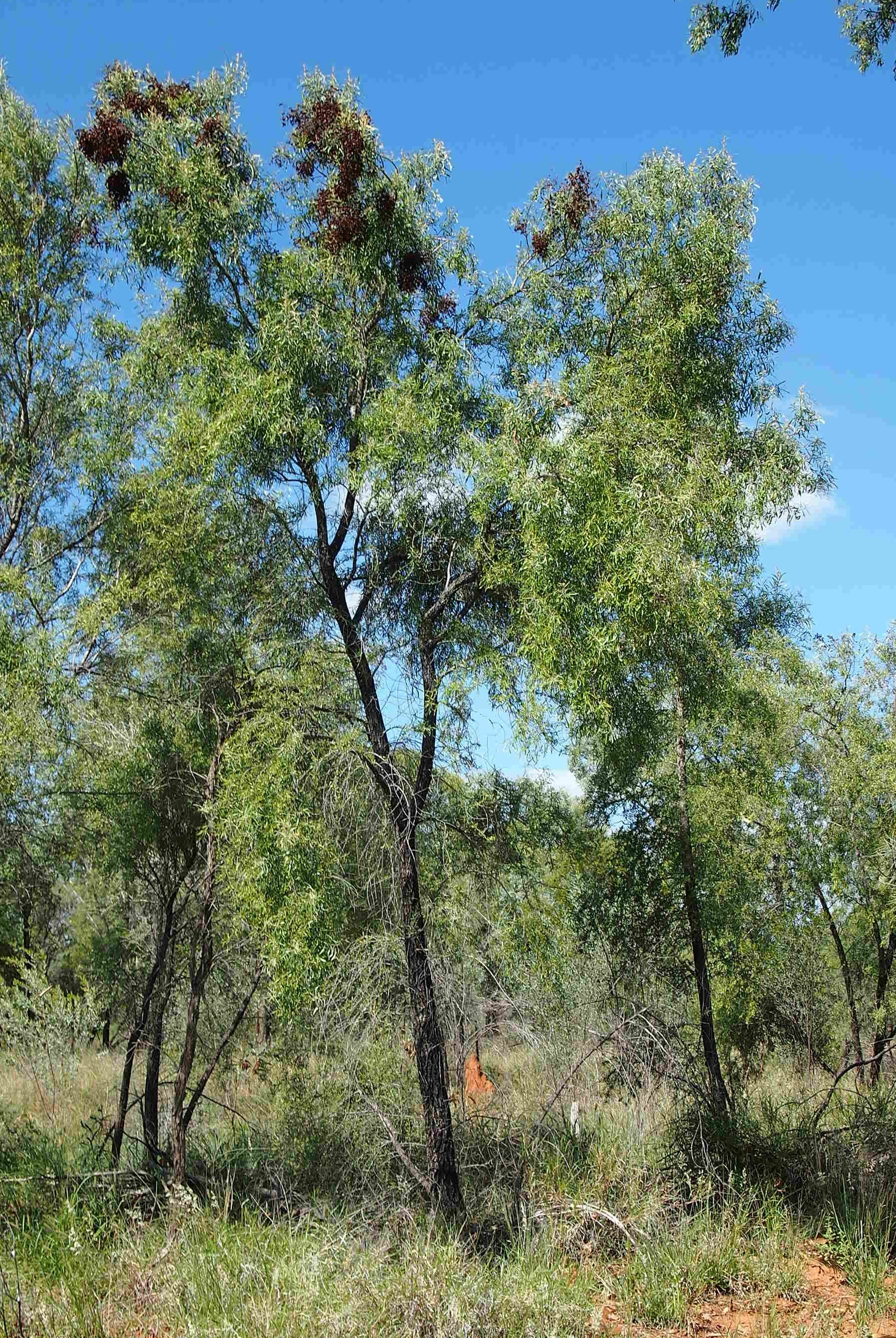
Habit

Bursaria incana, commonly known as prickly pine, box thorn, native box, native olive and mock orange, is a species of flowering plant in the family Pittosporaceae and is endemic to northern Australia. It is a tall shrub or small, sparse tree with softly-hairy foliage, heart-shaped leaves with the narrower end towards the base, leafy groups of white flowers with five spreading sepals, five spreading petals, and flattened fruit.

== Description ==
Bursaria incana is a tall shrub or sparse tree that typically grows to a height of 3–7 m (9.8–23.0 ft), its foliage mostly softly-hairy and the young branchlets spiny. Its adult leaves are heart-shaped to lance-shaped or egg-shaped with the narrower end towards the base, 60–90 mm (2.4–3.5 in) long, 6–16 mm (0.24–0.63 in) wide on a petiole less than 2 mm (0.079 in) long. The flowers are arranged in leafy groups, each flower on a pedicel less than 2 mm (0.079 in) long. The five sepals are 1–2 mm (0.039–0.079 in) long and free from each other, the five petals white, spreading from the base, 6.0–7.5 mm (0.24–0.30 in) long. The five stamens are free from each other and the pistil is densely covered with matted hairs. Flowering occurs in mid-summer, coinciding with the start of the dry season and the fruit is a flattened brown capsule 8–10 mm (0.31–0.39 in) long.

== Taxonomy ==
Bursaria incana was first formally described in 1848 by John Lindley in Thomas Mitchell's Journal of an Expedition into the Interior of Tropical Australia. The specific epithet (incana) means "grey".

== Distribution and habitat ==
This bursaria occurs throughout most of Queensland apart from near the coast and the arid inland, and in isolated populations in the northern part of the Northern Territory. It usually grows in open, grassy woodland and open forest.
