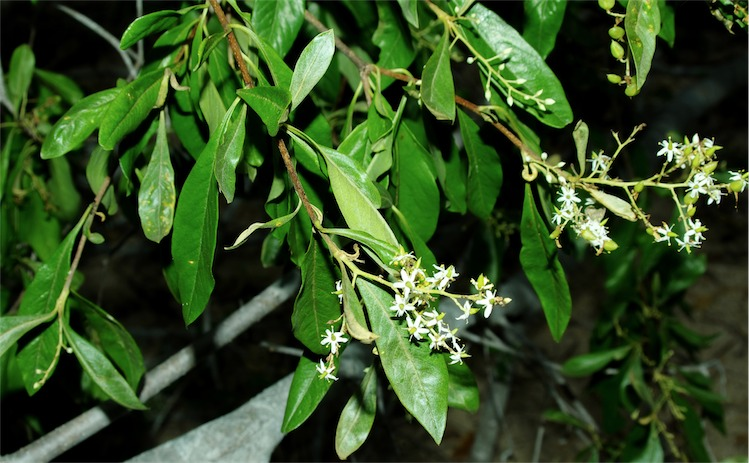
- Near the Coleman River on Cape York Peninsula

Conservation status
- Least Concern (IUCN 3.1)

Scientific classification
- Kingdom: Plantae
- Clade: Tracheophytes
- Clade: Angiosperms
- Clade: Eudicots
- Clade: Asterids
- Order: Apiales
- Family: Pittosporaceae
- Genus: Bursaria
- Species: B. tenuifolia

Binomial name
- Bursaria tenuifolia F.M.Bailey

= Bursaria tenuifolia =

Species of plant

Bursaria tenuifolia is a species of flowering plant in the family Pittosporaceae and is endemic to north-eastern Queensland. It is a shrub or spindly tree with elliptic to rhombic adult leaves, spiny foliage when young, flowers with five whitish petals, and slightly flattened, papery fruit.

== Description ==
Bursaria tenuifolia is a shrub or spindly tree that typically grows to a height of up to 20 m (66 ft) and has smooth, mottled bark. The young growth is armed with spines, the edges of leaves with teeth or lobes. Adult stages have few spines, the leaves elliptic to more or less rhombic, 40–80 mm (1.6–3.1 in) long and 10–22 mm (0.39–0.87 in) wide on a petiole 4–14 mm (0.16–0.55 in) long. There are both andromonoecious and bisexual flowers, the bisexual flowers on pedicels 6–8 mm (0.24–0.31 in) long. The sepals are 1–2 mm (0.039–0.079 in) long and spread from the base and the five petals are white, 4–6 mm (0.16–0.24 in) long and also spread from the base. Flowering mostly occurs from April to July and the fruit is a slightly flattened, papery capsule 6–8 mm (0.24–0.31 in) long and wide.

== Taxonomy ==
Bursaria tenuifolia was first formally described in 1899 by Frederick Manson Bailey in his book The Queensland Flora. The specific epithet (tenuifolia) means "narrow-leaved".

== Distribution and habitat ==
This bursaria grows in open scrubland and in the margins of rainforest at altitudes up to about 1,000 m (3,300 ft) and occurs in north-eastern Queensland.
