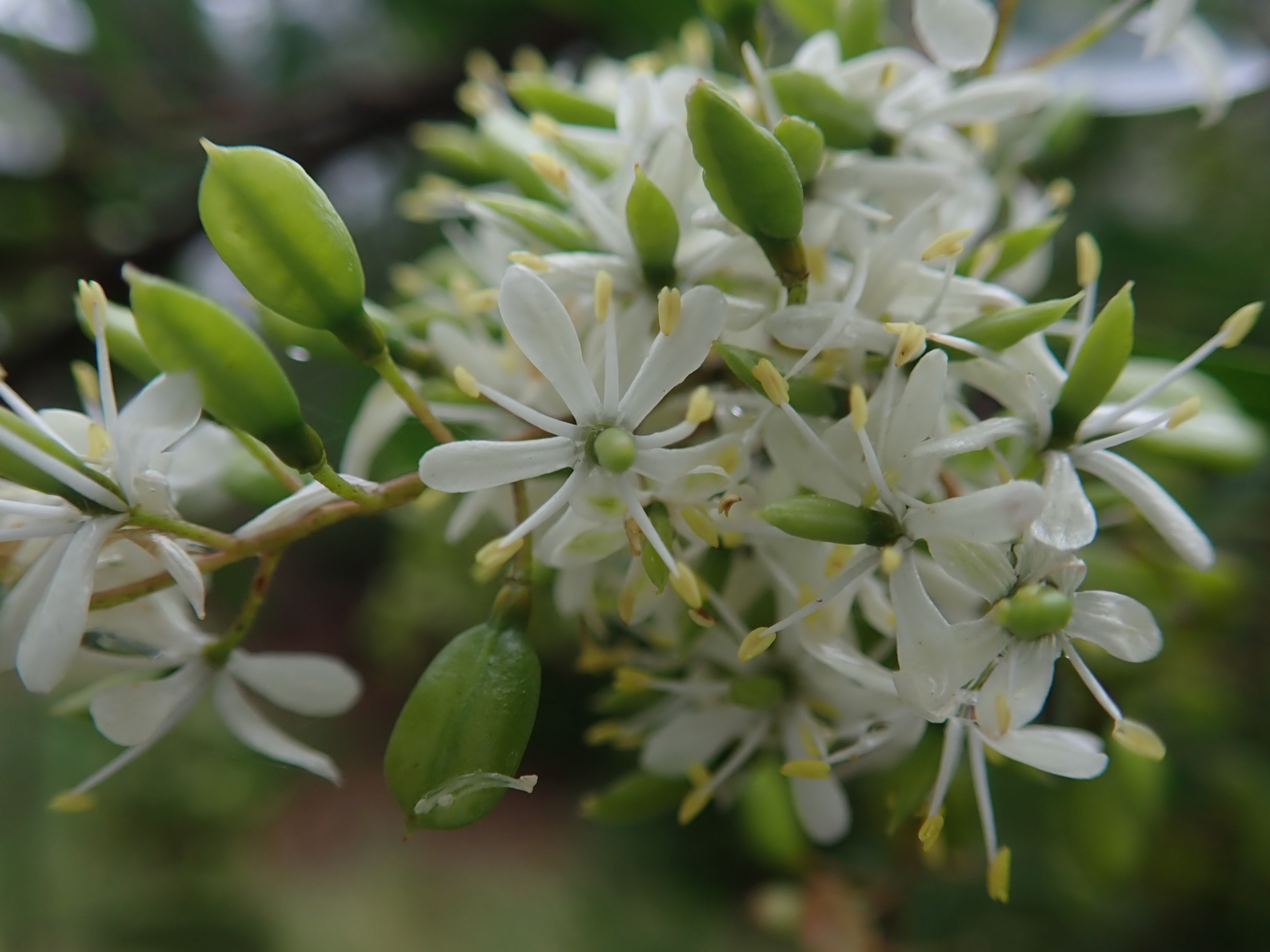
- Bursaria spinosa

Scientific classification
- Kingdom: Plantae
- Clade: Tracheophytes
- Clade: Angiosperms
- Clade: Eudicots
- Clade: Asterids
- Order: Apiales
- Family: Pittosporaceae
- Genus: Bursaria; Cav.

Species
- See text

= Bursaria =

Genus of flowering plants

Bursaria is a genus of eight species of flowering plants in the family Pittosporaceae and is endemic to Australia. They are shrubs or slender trees, often with spiny branches and have simple leaves, relatively small flowers with five sepals, five petals and five stamens, and fruit that is a flattened, thin-walled capsule.

== Description ==
Plants in the genus Bursaria range from low shrubs to small, slender trees and have branches that are often spiny. The leaves are arranged alternately along the branches or clustered and are linear to lance-shaped, egg-shaped or wedge-shaped, sometimes with toothed edges or a notched tip. The flowers are relatively small, arranged singly in racemes or panicles at the ends of branchlets or in leaf axils. There are five sepals that are free from each other, five narrow oblong, spreading white petals, and five stamens that are free from each other. The fruit is a flattened, thin-walled capsule containing ten to fifty kidney-shaped seeds.

== Taxonomy ==
The genus Bursaria was first formally described in 1797 by Antonio Cavanilles in his book Icones et descriptiones plantarum and the first species he described was Bursaria spinosa. The genus name, Bursaria means "possessing a bag or a satchel".

=== Species list ===
The names of eight species are accepted by the Australian Plant Census as of October 2021:

- Bursaria calcicola L.Cayzer, Crisp & I.Telford (N.S.W.)
- Bursaria cayzerae I.Telford & L.M.Copel. (N.S.W.)
- Bursaria incana Lindl. (N.T., Qld.)
- Bursaria longisepala Domin (N.S.W.)
- Bursaria occidentalis E.M.Benn. (W.A.)
- Bursaria reevesii L.Cayzer, Crisp & I.Telford (Qld.)
- Bursaria spinosa Cav. – sweet bursaria, blackthorn (S.A., Qld., N.S.W., Vic., Tas.)
- Bursaria tenuifolia F.M.Bailey (Qld.)

== Distribution ==
Species of Bursaria occur in all Australian states and territories and the Northern Territory.
