= Albrecht Weber =

German Indologist and historian (1825–1901)

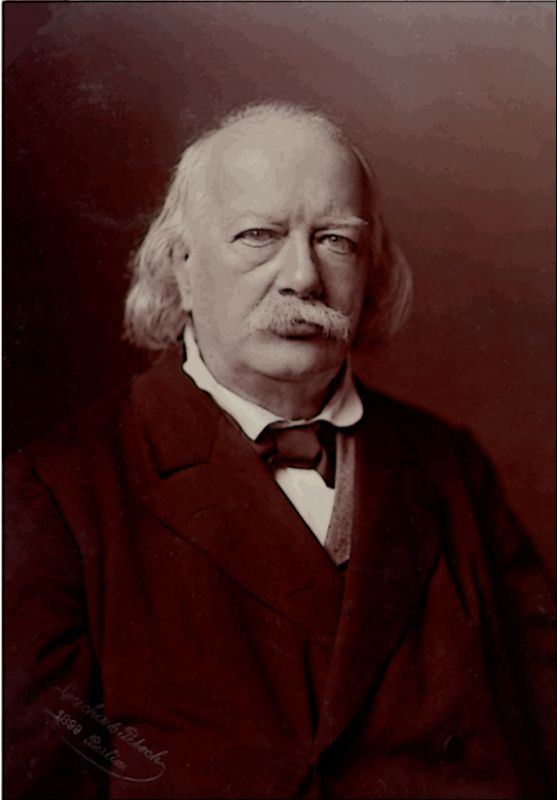
- Albrecht Weber in 1899
- Born: Friedrich Albrecht Weber; February 17, 1825; Breslau
- Died: November 30, 1901 (aged 76); Berlin
- Citizenship: Prussian
- Occupation: Indologist
- Spouse: Frederike Althauss
- Children: 6
- Parent: Friedrich Benedict Weber (father)

Academic work
- Discipline: Indology
- Doctoral students: Johannes Klatt
- Main interests: Vedic literature and Jainism

Friedrich Albrecht Weber (German pronunciation: [ˈalbʁɛçt ˈveːbɐ]; 17 February 1825 – 30 November 1901) was a Prussian-German Indologist and historian who studied the history of Jainism in India. Some older sources have the first and middle names interchanged.

== Biography ==
Weber was born in Breslau, where his father Friedrich Benedict Weber was a professor of political economy. The Protestant family had roots in Schleusingen, where their ancestors had held clerical posts.

Weber studied Greek, Latin and Hebrew in Thüringen. He then sought to become a historian and went to the University of Breslau. He studied Arabic under Hinrich Middeldorpf and Sanskrit under Adolf Friedrich Stenzler (1807–1887). In 1844, he spent two semester in Bonn attending classes under Christian Lassen and Johannes Gildemeister. At Stenzler's suggestion, he studied the Yajurveda, examining the ninth chapter of the Vâjasaneyi-Samhitâ from a copy in London. He also spent some time in 1845 in Berlin studying under Franz Bopp, H. J. Petermann, Wilhelm Schott, M. G. Schwanze, August Boeckh, Theodor Aufrecht, Adalbert Kuhn, Rudolf Roth and Karl Lachmann. He wrote his thesis in Latin in 1845.

In 1846, he visited England and France in connection with his studies and in the same winter his mother Ida Jähne died. On his return to Germany, he went to the University of Berlin, where he became privatdocent in 1848, and in 1856 became an adjunct professor of the language and literature of ancient India. In 1867, he was made full professor. He was a member of the Academy of Sciences of Berlin, and was the author of many books and periodical contributions on classical subjects. He was a close friend of Max Müller. Johannes Klatt was among his students.

Weber might be one of the earliest Indologists who emphasized the social philosophy of Buddhism. In his opinion, "Buddhism is, in its origin, one of the most magnificent and radical reactions in favour of the universal human rights of the individual against the oppressing tyranny of the pretended privileges of divine origin, of birth, and of class." Weber was specifically against the caste privileges of the Brahmins.

Weber married Emma Frederike Althauss in 1849. They had six children, three dying young in Berlin. Weber grew blind in his later years and died in 1901 in Berlin.

== Works ==
- Indische Studien, 1849–85 (18 vols.)
- Weiße Jadschurveda, London 1849-1859 (3 vols.)
- Schwarze Jadschurveda, Leipzig 1871-1872
- Tscharanawyuha. Übersicht über die Schulen der Vedas, Berlin 1855
- Akademische Vorlesungen über indische Litteraturgeschichte, Berlin, 1852; 2d ed. 1876 (translated by Zachariae and Mann, London, 1878)
- a translation of Kalidasa's drama Mālavikā und Agnimitra, 1856
- Indische Skizzen, Berlin 1857
- Indische Streifen, Berlin 1868–1879 (3 vols.)
- Verzeichnis der Sanskrithandschriften der königlichen Bibliothek zu Berlin, Berlin 1853–1892
- Über das Catrunjaya des Mahâtmyam, Leipzig 1858
- an edition of Hala's Saptasataka, 1881

He also contributed much lexicographical material, especially from Vedic literature, to the Sanskrit-Wörterbuch of Otto von Böhtlingk and Rudolf Roth.
