= Bursaria calcicola =

Scientific classification
- Kingdom: Plantae
- Clade: Tracheophytes
- Clade: Angiosperms
- Clade: Eudicots
- Clade: Asterids
- Order: Apiales
- Family: Pittosporaceae
- Genus: Bursaria
- Species: B. calcicola

Binomial name
- Bursaria calcicola L.Cayzer, Crisp & I.Telford

Species of plant

Bursaria calcicola is a species of flowering plant in the family Pittosporaceae and is endemic to a restricted area near Wombeyan Caves in New South Wales. It is a spiny, hairy, erect or sprawling shrub with clustered, narrowly elliptic to egg-shaped leaves, white flowers with triangular sepals, cream-coloured petals and flattened fruit.

== Description ==
Bursaria calcicola is an erect or sprawling shrub than typically grows to a height of less than 3 m (9.8 ft), its foliage covered with hairs flattened against the surface and its branches armed with spines. The leaves are clustered, sessile, egg-shaped with the narrower end towards the base, about 12 mm (0.47 in) long, 2–3 mm (0.079–0.118 in) wide and toothed on the edges near the ends. The flowers are white arranged in groups on the ends of branches, sometimes on short side shoots, each flower on a pedicel with five distinctive, triangular sepals 3.0–3.5 mm (0.12–0.14 in) long and free from each other. The five petals spread from the base, are cream-coloured and 6–8 mm (0.24–0.31 in) long. The five stamens are free from each other, with the filament much shorter than the anthers, and the pistil is hairy and white. Flowering occurs in late spring and the fruit is a flattened capsule 8–10 mm (0.31–0.39 in) in diameter.

== Taxonomy ==
Bursaria calcicola was first formally described in 1999 by Lindy W. Cayzer, Michael Crisp and Ian Telford in the journal Australian Systematic Botany from specimens collected by Cayzer in Wombeyan Caves Reserve. The specific epithet (calcicola) means "limestone-dweller".

== Distribution and habitat ==
This bursaria is only known from the Wombeyan Caves area where it grows in woodland on soils derived from limestone.
