= Hugo Heimann =

German politician (1859–1950)

Member of the City council of Berlin
- In office 1900–1932

Prussian House of Representatives
- In office 1908–1910

Weimar National Assembly
- In office 1919–1920

Member of the Reichstag
- In office 1920–1932
- Constituency: Berlin

Personal details
- Born: 15 April 1859 Konitz, West Prussia (Chojnice, Poland)
- Died: 23 February 1951 (aged 91) New York City, United States
- Party: Social Democratic Party of Germany (SPD)
- Spouse: Caecilie Levy (1863-)
- Children: Eduard Heimann, Leonhard, Johanna
- Occupation: bookseller, publisher

Hugo Heimann (15 April 1859 – 23 February 1951) was a German publisher and Social Democratic politician.

== Biography ==
Heimann was born in Konitz, Kingdom of Prussia, the son of Eduard (1818–1861) and Marie Heimann. The family moved to Berlin, where he attended the Evangelisches Gymnasium zum Grauen Kloster but left school without passing his Abitur. He started an apprenticeship as a bookseller and worked at Nicholas Trübner publishing house in London from 1880 to 1884. He became Trübner's private secretary and returned to Berlin after Trübner's death. Here, he became a partner of the J. Guttentagsche Verlagsbuchhandlung publishing house and its sole proprietor in 1890. Heimann's publishing house became the official publisher for juridical publications of the Reichsjustizamt, especially regarding the new nationwide civil law code, the Bürgerliches Gesetzbuch. In 1898, he sold the company, which would become part of Walter de Gruyter in 1919.

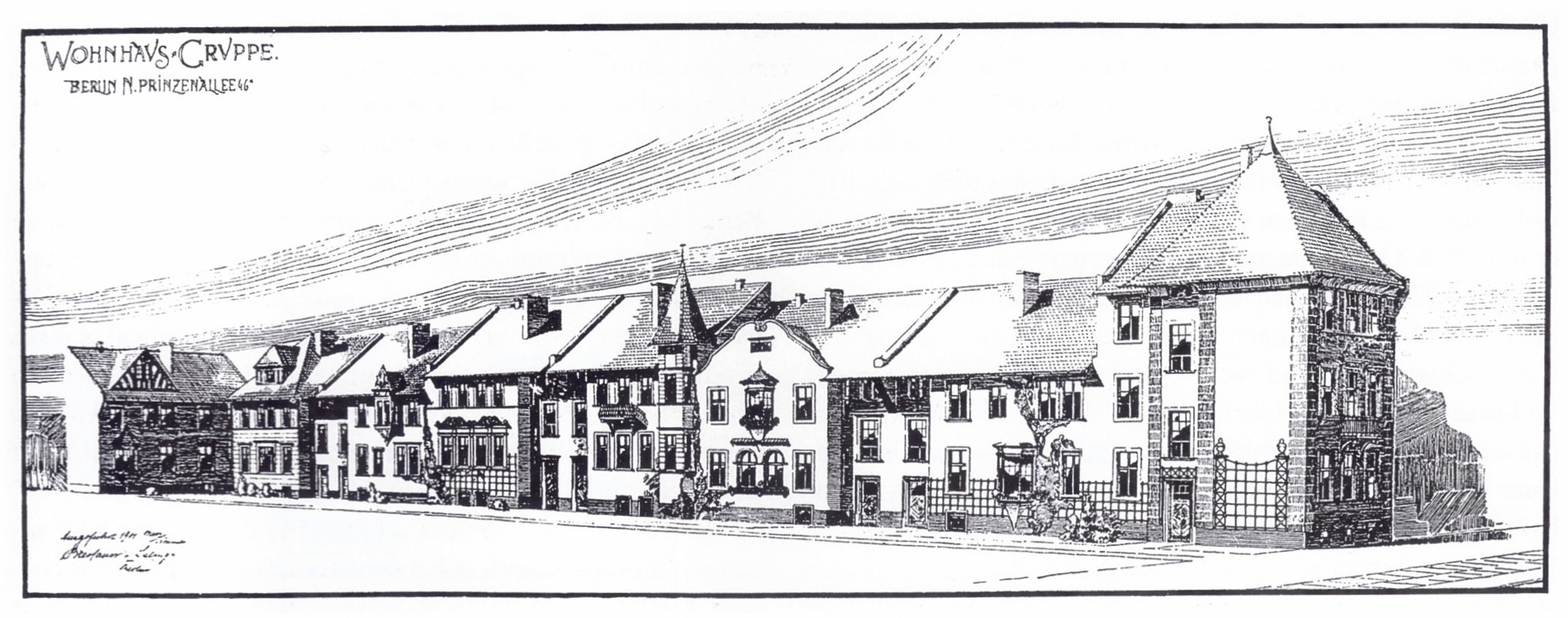
The Red Houses, Prinzenallee 46A, Berlin

In 1899, with a donation of 600,000 goldmarks, he founded the Free Public library in Berlin-Kreuzberg. Initially stocked with 7,000 books it soon reached a number of 20,000 volumes and 540 newspapers and magazines. The first floor of the library housed the official archives of the Social Democratic Party, about 8000 printed and numerous handwritten documents. The archive included the private library of Karl Marx and Friedrich Engels, which was systematized under the supervision of Max Schippel. While the bulk of the official archive was moved to the SPD's headquarter in November 1904, 443 books remained at Heimann's library, including a large number of books of Marx and Engels' provenance.

Following World War I Heimann gifted the library to the City of Berlin in 1919 which renamed the library "Hugo Heimannsche Bücherei und Lesehalle" in 1920. Since opening it had attracted 2.5 million visitors.

In 1901 he financed the construction of a row of eight small houses, the Red Houses at Prinzenallee 46, Gesundbrunnen. The property was transferred to several Social Democratic politicians like Karl Liebknecht, Eduard Bernstein and Paul Singer, which, as private real estate was a binding premise for passive electoral rights, allowed them to be elected to the City council.

=== Political career ===
Heimann joined the Social Democratic Party of Germany and became a close friend of August Bebel and Paul Singer. He was a member of the Berlin city council from 1900 to 1932, his fraction's chairman from 1911 to 1925 and the city council chairman from 1919 to 1932.

Heimann was one of the first eight Social Democrats elected as members of the Prussian House of Representatives under the terms of the Prussian three-class franchise in 1908.

Throughout the German Revolution of 1918-1919 Heimann was a People's deputy in Berlin and became a member of the Weimar National Assembly of 1919/20. From 1920 to 1932 Heimann represented the Berlin constituency (Berlin 2) in the Reichstag, he was almost perpetually chairman of the budget committee.

=== Exile in the US ===
In 1939 Heimann emigrated via the United Kingdom to the United States, where both of his sons, Leonhard and Eduard Heimann, lived. His daughter Johanna remained in Germany and was either deported and killed in a Concentration camp or committed suicide facing her deportation.

In exile he was active in the Social Democratic Federation. He did not return to Germany after World War II and died in New York City in 1951.

== Remembrance ==
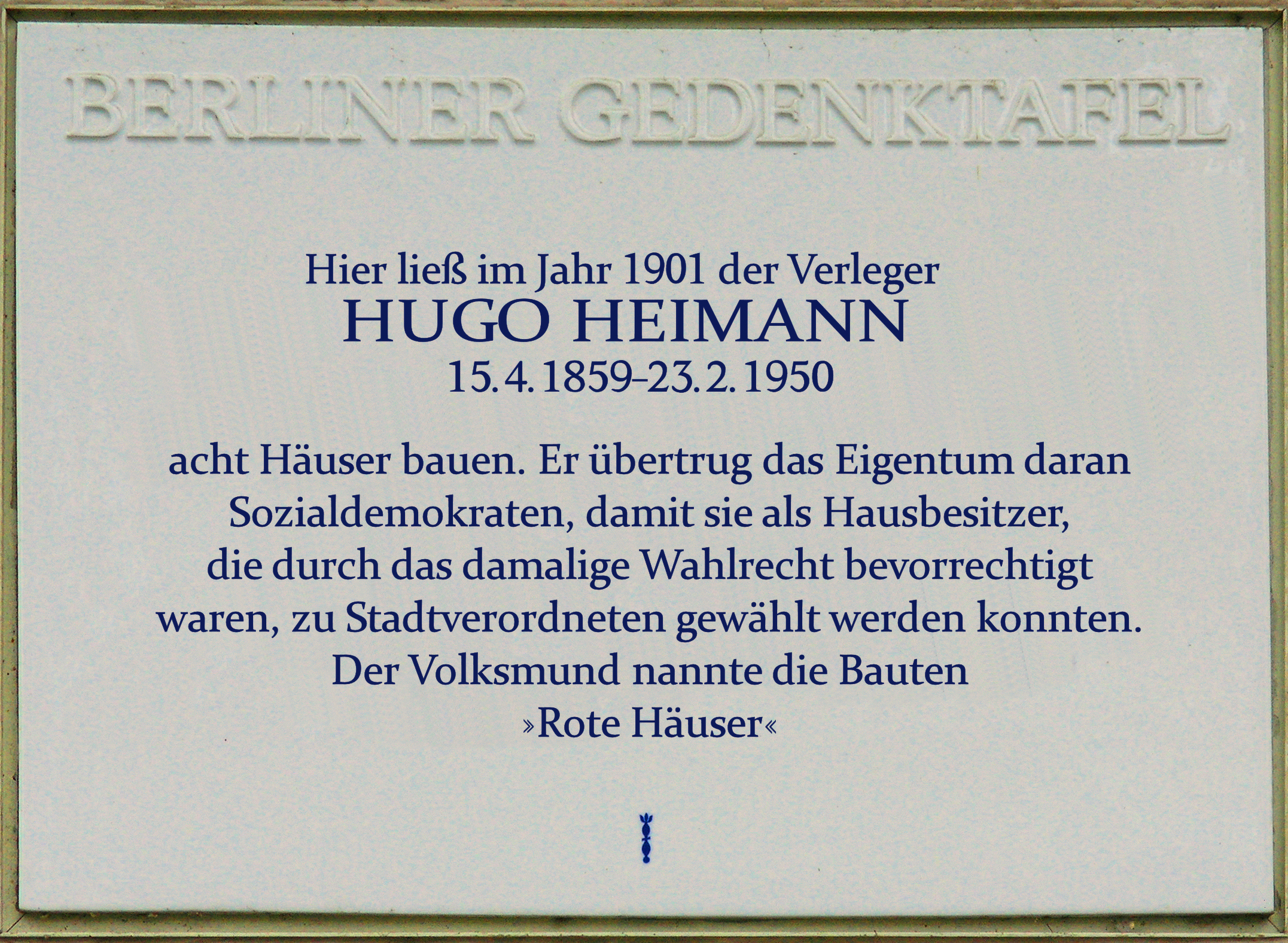
Memorial plaque in Berlin-Gesundbrunnen, Prinzenallee 46a

Heimann became the 56th honorary citizen of Berlin in 1926. This was revoked by the Nazis in 1933 but restored in 1947.

A memorial plaque at the location of the Red Houses, which were destroyed in World War II, the Hugo-Heimann-Bridge, the Hugo Heimann library (closed in 2015) and the Hugo-Heimann-school at Hugo-Heimann-Straße remember him.
