= Franz Joseph Dölger =

German Catholic theologian and church historian

Franz Joseph Dölger (18 October 1879, in Sulzbach am Main – 17 October 1940, in Schweinfurt) was a German Catholic theologian and church historian.

He studied theology at the University of Würzburg, being ordained into the priesthood in 1902. Afterwards he worked as a chaplain in Amorbach and Würzburg, and in June 1904, obtained his doctorate in theology.

In the winter and spring of 1904–05, he participated in a study group to Rome, Sicily and North Africa. Later on, he furthered his education at the Campo Santo Teutonico in Rome (1908–11), followed by an appointment as associate professor of religious history at Westphalian Wilhelms-University in Münster (1911). Later in his career, he served as a professor at the universities of Breslau (1926–29; as successor to Joseph Wittig) and Bonn (1929–40).

Dölger's primary focus involved investigations of the early Christian church and its relationship with non-Christian societies. He also published scholarly works on the sacrament of confirmation, on exorcism, on baptism, and on the Eucharist in ancient Christianity. In 1929 he founded the journal Antike und Christentum ("Antiquity and Christianity"), of which he contributed a series of detailed studies of the early church.

Today, the Franz Joseph Dölger-Institut zur Erforschung der Spätantike (Franz Joseph Dölger Institute for Exploration of the Late Antiquity; founded 1955) at the University of Bonn is named in his honor.

== Selected publications ==
- Das Sakrament der Firmung (The sacrament of confirmation), 1906.
- Der Exorzismus im altchristlichen Taufritual (Exorcism in ancient Christian baptism rites), 1909.
- Ichthys; Das Fischsymbol in frühchristlicher (Ichthys: The fish symbol in early Christianity), 1910.
- Konstantin der Große und seine Zeit (Constantine the Great and his era), 1913
- Sol Salutis. Gebet und Gesang im christlichen Altertum (Sol Salutis: prayer and song in Christian antiquity), 1920.
- Die Fischdenkmäler in der frühchristlichen Plastik, Malerei und Kleinkunst (Fish memorials in early Christian sculpture, painting and minor arts), 1932.
