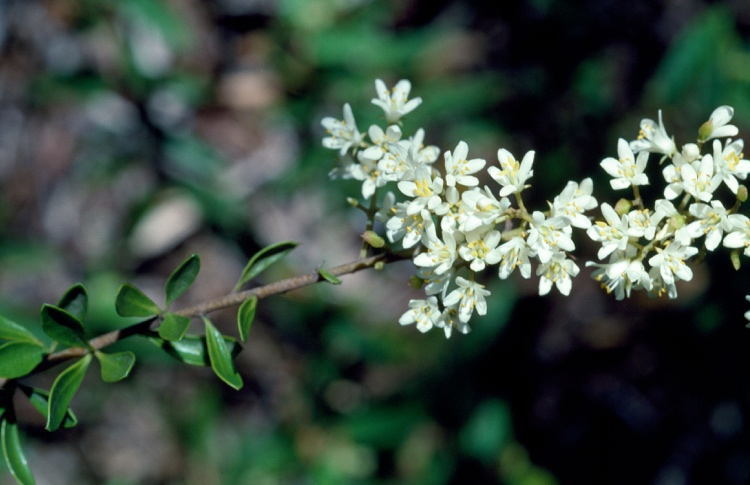
- In the Australian National Botanic Gardens

Scientific classification
- Kingdom: Plantae
- Clade: Tracheophytes
- Clade: Angiosperms
- Clade: Eudicots
- Clade: Asterids
- Order: Apiales
- Family: Pittosporaceae
- Genus: Bursaria
- Species: B. reevesii

Binomial name
- Bursaria reevesii L.Cayzer, Crisp & I.Telford

= Bursaria reevesii =

Species of plant

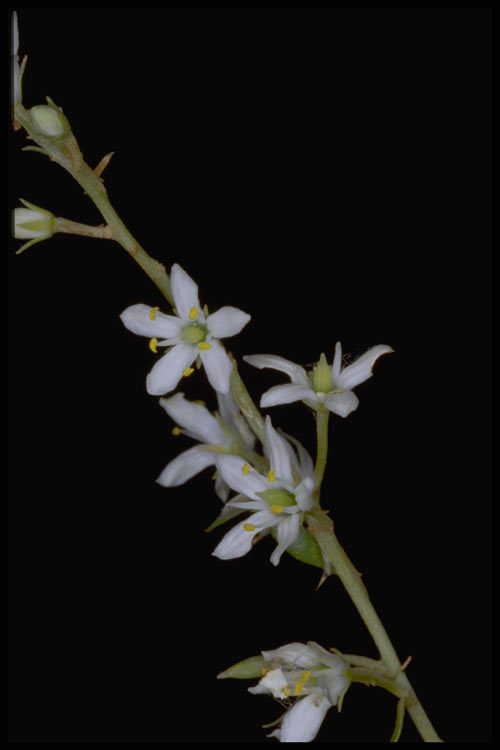
Flower detail

Bursaria reevesii is a species of flowering plant in the family Pittosporaceae and is endemic to a few places near Marlborough in Queensland. It is an erect or sprawling shrub with spiny side-shoots, egg-shaped adult leaves with the narrower end towards the base, flowers with five white petals, and rounded fruit.

== Description ==
Bursaria reevesii is an erect or sprawling, multi-stemmed shrub that typically grows to a height of up to 3 m (9.8 ft), its young side-shoots armed with spines. New growth has elliptic leaves clustered around the spiny side-shoots, the edges of the leaves toothed. Adult growth has fewer spines and egg-shaped leaves with the narrower end towards the base, 16–30 mm (0.63–1.18 in) long and 5–8 mm (0.20–0.31 in) wide on a petiole 1–3 mm (0.039–0.118 in) long. The flowers are white and arranged in small groups, each flower on a pedicel4–6 mm (0.16–0.24 in) long with paired bracts at the base. The sepals are 1–2 mm (0.039–0.079 in) long and spread from the base and the five petals are white, 5–6 mm (0.20–0.24 in) long and also spread from the base. Flowering mostly occurs in April and May and the fruit is a rounded capsule 6–9 mm (0.24–0.35 in) in diameter.

== Taxonomy ==
Bursaria reevesii was first formally described in 1999 by Lindy W. Cayzer, Michael Crisp and Ian Telford in the journal Australian Systematic Botany from specimens collected by Paul Irwin Forster in the Port Curtis district. The specific epithet (reevesii) honours Roger D. Reeves of New Zealand, for his work on the flora of serpentinite areas.

== Distribution and habitat ==
This bursaria is only known from a few areas of serpentinite in the Marlborough area of Queensland.
