= Bursaria cayzerae =

Scientific classification
- Kingdom: Plantae
- Clade: Tracheophytes
- Clade: Angiosperms
- Clade: Eudicots
- Clade: Asterids
- Order: Apiales
- Family: Pittosporaceae
- Genus: Bursaria
- Species: B. cayzerae

Binomial name
- Bursaria cayzerae I.Telford & L.M.Copel.

Species of plant

Bursaria cayzerae is a species of flowering plant in the family Pittosporaceae and is endemic to the North Coast of New South Wales. It is a sparsely-branched shrub with spiny branches, narrowly elliptic leaves, flowers with five glabrous sepals, spreading white petals and five stamens, and flattened fruit.

== Description ==
Bursaria cayzerae is a spiny, sparsely-branched shrub that typically grows to a height of up to 2 m (6 ft 7 in), its foliage covered with woolly hairs. Its adult leaves are narrowly elliptic to lance-shaped with the narrower end towards the base, 9.5–19 mm (0.37–0.75 in) long, 1.7–3 mm (0.067–0.118 in) wide on a petiole about 0.7 mm (0.028 in) long. The flowers are usually arranged singly in leaf axils, sometimes in groups of up to five, each flower on a hairy pedicel 0.8–1.2 mm (0.031–0.047 in) long. The sepals are lance-shaped, 2.4–3.6 mm (0.094–0.142 in) long, glabrous and free from each other. The five petals are white and spread from the base, 7.2–9.0 mm (0.28–0.35 in) long. The five stamens are white and free from each other, the filaments 4.5–6.0 mm (0.18–0.24 in) long, and the pistil is glabrous. Flowering occurs in late spring and the fruit is a flattened capsule 6–10 mm (0.24–0.39 in) long.

== Taxonomy ==
Bursaria cayzerae was first formally described in 2013 by Ian Telford and Lachlan Mackenzie Copeland in the journal Telopea from specimens collected near Grafton in 2012. The specific epithet (cayzerae) honours Lindy W. Cayzer for her work on the Pittosporaceae.

== Distribution and habitat ==
This bursaria is only known from near Grafton on the North Coast of New South Wales where it grows in shrubby woodland.
