= Klatt =

Klatt is a surname. Notable people with the surname include:

- Bernard Klatt, former Canadian internet service provider
- Bill Klatt (1947–2011), retired professional ice hockey player
- Dennis H. Klatt, (1938–1988), American researcher in speech and hearing science
- Dusty Klatt, professional motocross racer from Campbell River, British Columbia, Canada
- Friedrich Wilhelm Klatt (1825–1897), German botanist who specialised in the study of African plants
- Joel Klatt (born 1982), currently a talk radio personality on 102
- Johannes Klatt (1852–1908), Prussian–German Indologist and librarian
- Marcin Klatt (born 1985), Polish footballer who plays for Pogoń Szczecin
- Paul Klatt (1896–1973), German general who commanded the 3. Gebirgs-Division
- Trent Klatt (born 1971), retired American professional ice hockey right winger
- Werner Klatt (born 1948), German rower who competed for East Germany in the 1976 Summer Olympics

== See also ==
- Klaatu, a character in the 1951 film The Day the Earth Stood Still
