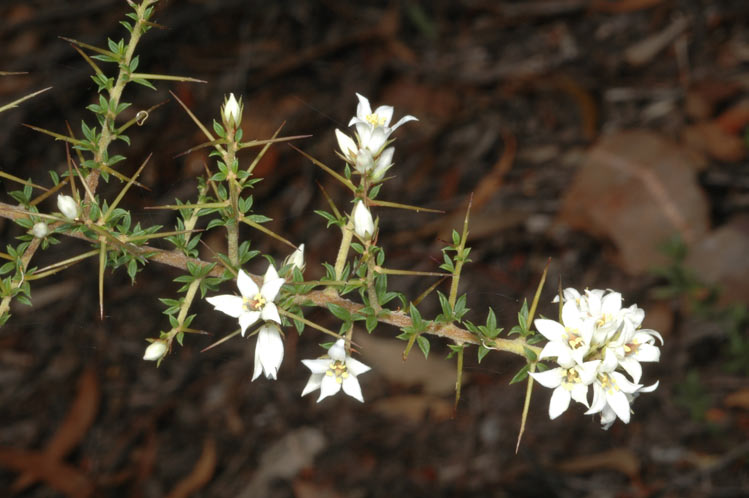
- In the Australian National Botanic Gardens

Scientific classification
- Kingdom: Plantae
- Clade: Tracheophytes
- Clade: Angiosperms
- Clade: Eudicots
- Clade: Asterids
- Order: Apiales
- Family: Pittosporaceae
- Genus: Bursaria
- Species: B. longisepala

Binomial name
- Bursaria longisepala Domin

Synonyms
- Bursaria longisepala Domin var. longisepala

= Bursaria longisepala =

Species of plant

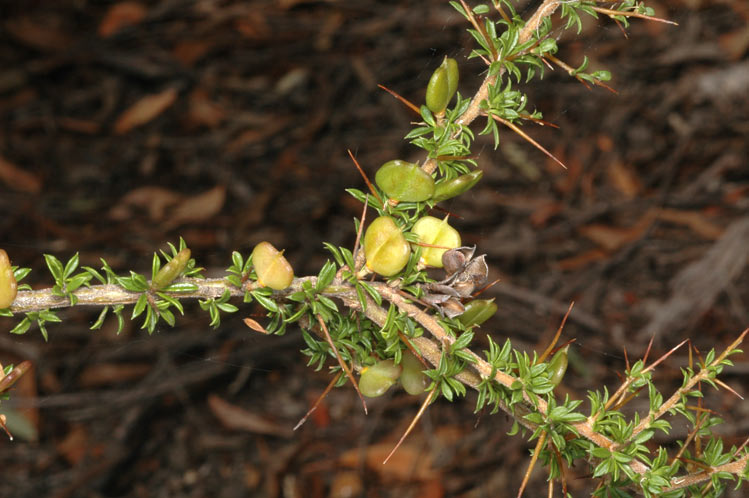
Branch with fruit

Bursaria longisepala is a species of flowering plant in the family Pittosporaceae and is endemic to New South Wales. It is a spiny, sprawling shrub with narrowly elliptic leaves clustered around spiny side-shoots, flowers with relatively large sepals, five spreading white petals and five stamens, and concave fruit.

== Description ==
Bursaria longisepala is a spiny, sprawling shrub that typically grows to a height of less than 1 m (3 ft 3 in), some stands retaining juvenile characteristics. Young plants have clustered, thin, more or less sessile elliptic leaves 8–12 mm (0.31–0.47 in) long and 1.0–1.5 mm (0.039–0.059 in) wide with toothed edges. Adult plants have sessile, dark green, narrowly elliptic leaves 6–9 mm (0.24–0.35 in) long and 1–3 mm (0.039–0.118 in) wide clustered around spiny side-shoots. The flowers are arranged singly, in pairs or in small groups at the ends of branchlets, each flower on a pedicel 2–5 mm (0.079–0.197 in) long. The sepals are larger in this species than in others of the genus, green or cream-coloured, 3.5–4.0 mm (0.14–0.16 in) long, free from each other and spreading from the base. The five petals are white and spread from the base, 6–8 mm (0.24–0.31 in) long. Flowering mainly occurs in summer and the fruit is a concave capsule 5–6 mm (0.20–0.24 in) long and 5–8 mm (0.20–0.31 in) wide.

== Taxonomy ==
Bursaria longisepala was first formally described in 1926 by Karel Domin in the journal Bibliotheca Botanica from specimens he collected in the Blue Mountains in 1910.

== Distribution and habitat ==
This bursaria mostly grows on south-facing cliffs and in disturbed areas in forest and woodland and is mainly found in the Blue Mountains and sometimes on the central coast of New South Wales.
