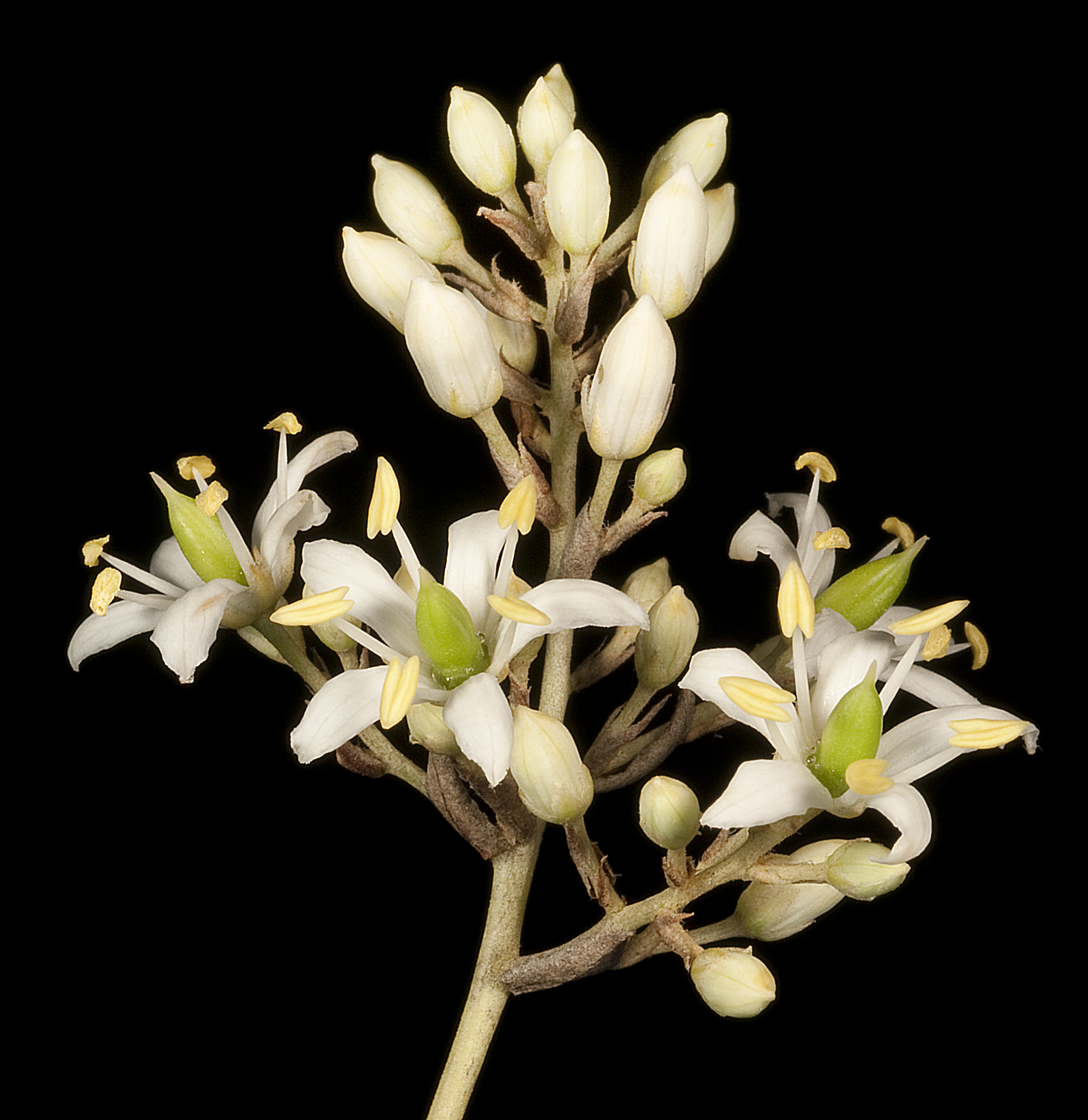

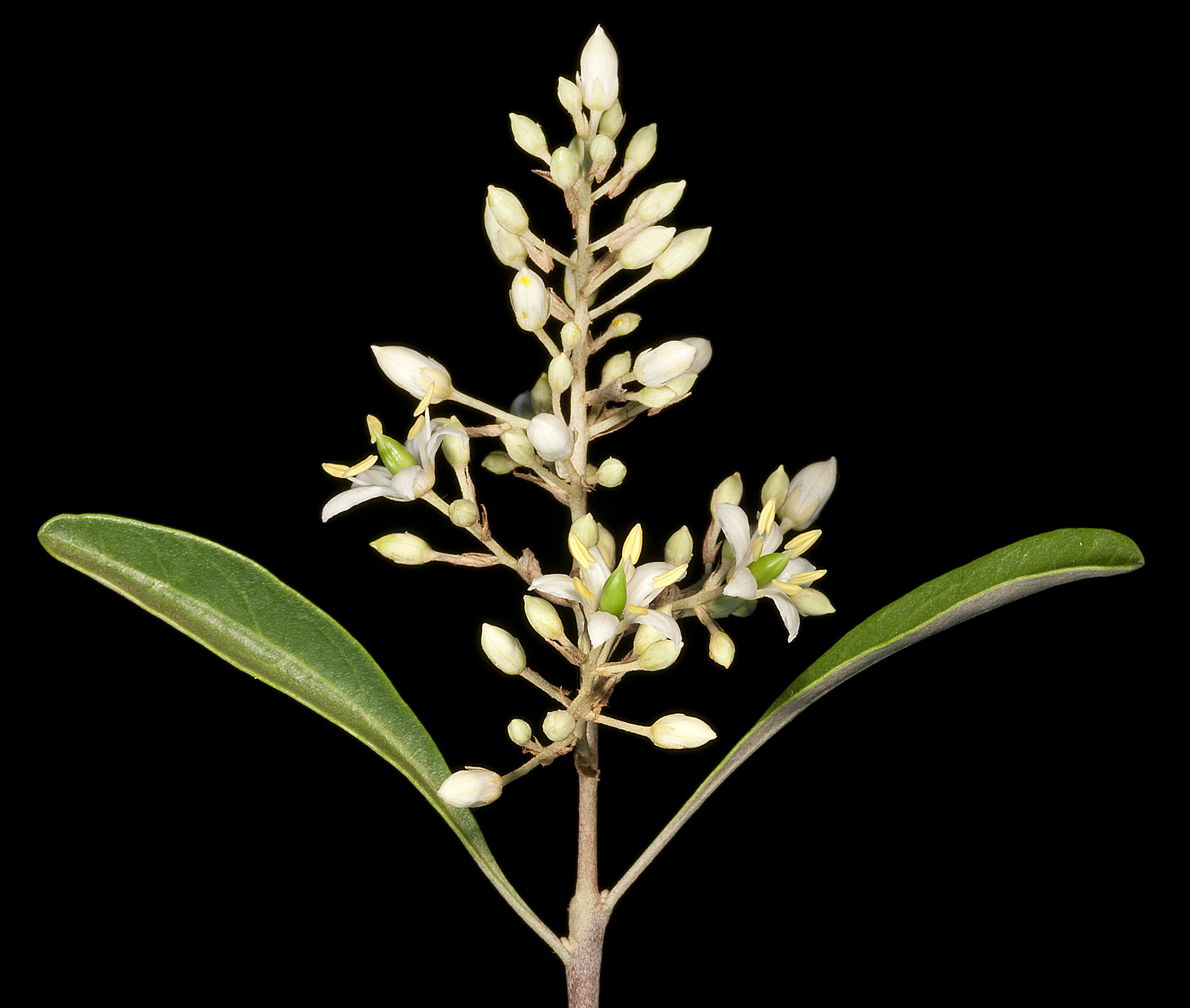

Conservation status
- Least Concern (IUCN 3.1)

Scientific classification
- Kingdom: Plantae
- Clade: Tracheophytes
- Clade: Angiosperms
- Clade: Eudicots
- Clade: Asterids
- Order: Apiales
- Family: Pittosporaceae
- Genus: Bursaria
- Species: B. occidentalis

Binomial name
- Bursaria occidentalis E.M.Benn.

= Bursaria occidentalis =

Species of flowering plant

Bursaria occidentalis is a species of flowering plant in the family Pittosporaceae and is endemic to Western Australia. It is a spiny tree or shrub with egg-shaped adult leaves, flowers with relatively small, hairy sepals and five spreading creamy-white petals, and inflated capsules.

== Description ==
Bursaria occidentalis is a tree that typically grows to a height of 8 m (26 ft), sometimes a shrub to 1.2 m (3 ft 11 in), and usually only has spiny branches when young. The adult leaves are egg-shaped with the narrower end towards the base, hairy on the lower surface, 30–70 mm (1.2–2.8 in) long and 5–10 mm (0.20–0.39 in) wide on a petiole 3–8 mm (0.12–0.31 in) long. The plants have both andromonoecious and bisexual flowers borne in groups on the ends of branchlets, each flower on a pedicel 3–6 mm (0.12–0.24 in) long. The sepals are hairy, less than 2 mm (0.079 in) long and spread from their bases and the petals are creamy-white, 5–6 mm (0.20–0.24 in) long and also spread from their bases. Flowering occurs from August to December and the fruit is an inflated capsule 10–11 mm (0.39–0.43 in) long and wide containing winged, brown seeds.

== Taxonomy ==
Bursaria occidentalis was first formally described in 1978 by Eleanor Marion Bennett in the journal Nuytsia from specimens she collected near Shark Bay in 1975.

== Distribution and habitat ==
This bursaria grows in mallee woodland between Shark Bay, Dongara and Menzies in the Avon Wheatbelt, Coolgardie, Geraldton Sandplains, Murchison and Yalgoo biogeographic regions of Western Australia. In some places it may be the only tree species.
