= Joseph Wittig =

German theologian and writer (1879–1949)

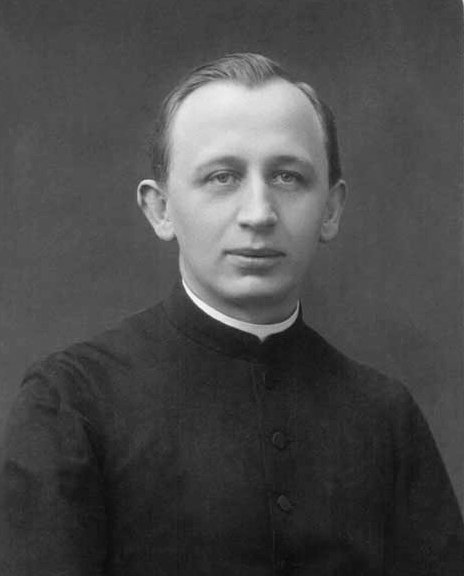
Joseph Wittig

Joseph Wittig (January 22, 1879 – August 22, 1949) was a German Catholic theologian and writer born in Neusorge, a village in the district of Neurode, Silesia.

In 1903 he received his doctorate of theology from the University of Breslau, and was ordained a priest by Cardinal Georg von Kopp (1837–1914). Subsequently, he worked as a chaplain in Lauban, and from 1904 studied Christian art and architecture in Rome as a member of the German Archaeological Institute. In the meantime, he took part in a study trip to North Africa. being accompanied by theologian Franz Joseph Dölger (1879–1940). After returning to Germany, he served as a chaplain in Patschkau, followed by similar duties in Breslau.

In 1911 Wittig became an associate professor of church history and Christian archaeology, and in 1915 was a full professor of patrology, church history and Christian art at the theological faculty of the University of Breslau. In 1917-18 he attained the office of dean at the university.

Wittig is remembered for his work as a religious reformer at Breslau. His theological and literary ideas often placed him at odds with Catholic Church hierarchy. In 1922 he was the author of Die Erlösten (The Redeemed), an article that was openly critical of church dogma, and in 1925 published a book that was an historical reconstruction of the life of Jesus Christ. This latter work, Leben Jesu in Palästina, Schlesien und anderswo, was placed on the Church's index of banned books. In 1926 Wittig was excommunicated from the Church, and forced to resign his teaching position at Breslau. It wouldn't be until 1946 that he was able to receive official reconciliation with Church hierarchy.

Following his excommunication, he returned to Neusorge as a private scholar and writer. Here he was the author of numerous popular stories as well as religious-themed works. During this time period, he also worked as a chronicler in the district of Neurode.

With philosopher Martin Buber (1878–1965) and physiologist Viktor von Weizsäcker (1886–1957), he was co-editor of the magazine Die Kreatur, which was founded by Hans Ehrenberg and Eugen Rosenstock-Huessy.
