= Johannes Klatt =

German Indologist

Johannes Emil Otto Klatt
- Born: January 31, 1852; Filehne (now Wieleń)
- Died: August 28, 1908 (aged 56); Bonn
- Citizenship: Prussian
- Occupations: Librarian and scholar
- Spouse: Margarete Patzig (1861–1928)
- Children: Fritz Klatt (1888–1945); Albert Klatt (Q94874385) (1892–1970)

Academic background
- Education: University of Halle
- Thesis: De trecentis Cāṇakyae poetae indici sententiis (1873)
- Doctoral advisor: Albrecht Weber

Academic work
- Discipline: Indology
- Sub-discipline: Jain studies
- Institutions: Royal Library in Berlin (now the Berlin State Library)
- Main interests: Jainism
- Notable works: Jaina-Onomasticon

Johannes Emil Otto Klatt (31 January 1852 in Wieleń – 28 August 1908, Bonn) was a Prussian-German Indologist and librarian who studied the history of Jainism in India.

== Biography ==
Johannes Klatt was born on 31 January 1852 in Filehne (now Wieleń), in the Prussian Province of Posen.

From 1868 to 1872, he studied Indology in Berlin under Albrecht Weber. In 1873, he finished his doctorate at the University of Halle.

At the Royal Library in Berlin (now the Berlin State Library), Klatt's appointments were as follows.

- 1872: part-time staff
- 1874: assistant
- October 1880: Kustos (custodian)
- April 1889: Bibliothecarius (librarian)

He died in Bonn on 28 August 1908.

== Jaina-Onomasticon ==
His magnum opus, the Jaina-Onomasticon, was a comprehensive bibliography listing names of Jain authors, texts, and toponyms, as well as biographies. The nearly completed manuscript, handwritten consisted of over 4,000 pages written in English, but just over 100 pages were published during his lifetime. Due to illness, he was unable to complete the work and died in 1908.

The Jaina-Onomasticon was edited and published in 2016 by Peter Flügel and Kornelius Krümpelmann. It is the largest prosopography in Jain studies.

== Personal life ==
Klatt was married to Margarete Patzig (1861–1928). They had two sons, Fritz Klatt (1888–1945), an educator, and Albert Klatt (1892–1970), a painter.

== Bibliography ==
Below is a list of works by Johannes Emil Klatt, as given by Flügel (2011).

- De trecentis Cāṇakyae poetae Indici sententiis dissertatio inauguralis philologica, quam consensu et auctoritate amplissimi philosophorum ordinis in Academia Fridericiana Halensi cum Vitebergensi consociata ad summos in philosophia honores capessendos d. XV m. Febr. a. MDCCCLXXIII hor. XII una cum thesibus publice defendet scriptor Johannes Klatt Brombergensis : adversariorum partes susceperunt Konrad Zacher, cand. phil., Aemilius Gaessner, cand. phil. Academia Fridericiana, Halis Saxonum, 1873 (Berolini, Typis: A W. Schadii).
- ‘Dhanapāla's Ṛishabhapañcāçikā’. Zeitschrift der Deutschen Morgenländischen Gesellschaft 33 (1879a) 445–477.
- ‘Die Jaina-Handschriften der K. Bibliothek zu Berlin’. Zeitschrift der Deutschen Morgenländischen Gesellschaft 33 (1879b) 478–483.
- ‘Vorderindien’. Zeitschrift der Deutschen Morgenländischen Gesellschaft. Jahresbericht der Deutschen Morgenländischen Gesellschaft 34 (1880) 13–43.
- ‘Vorderindien’. Zeitschrift der Deutschen Morgenländischen Gesellschaft. Jahresbericht der Deutschen Morgenländischen Gesellschaft 35 (1881) 20–59.
- ‘Indien’. Jahresbericht der Geschichtswissenschaft. Im Auftrage der Historischen Gesellschaft zu Berlin herausgegeben von F. Abraham, J. Hermann und E. Meyer. II. Jahrgang 1879. Berlin: Ernst Siegfried Mittler & Sohn, [1880] (1881) 1-26.
- ‘Islam’. Jahresbericht der Geschichtswissenschaft. Im Auftrage der Historischen Gesellschaft zu Berlin herausgegeben von F. Abraham, J. Hermann und E. Meyer. II. Jahrgang 1879. Berlin: Ernst Siegfried Mittler & Sohn, [1880] (1881) 237–249.
- ‘Indische Drucke’. Zeitschrift der Deutschen Morgenländischen Gesellschaft 35 (1881) 189–206.
- ‘Extracts from the Historical Records of the Jains’. Indian Antiquary 11 (1882) 245–256.
- ‘Christian Lassen’. Allgemeine Deutsche Biographie 17 (1883) 784–788.
- Literatur-Blatt für orientalische Philologie. Band 1–4. Hg. Ernst Wilhelm Adalbert Kuhn. Unter Mitwirkung von Johannes Klatt. Leipzig: Schulze, 1883-1886 (Later: Orientalische Bibliographie).
- ‘Eine apokryphe Paṭṭāvalī der Jainas’. Festgruss an Otto von Böhtlingk zum Doktor-Jubiläum 3. Februar 1888 von seinen Freunden, 54–59. Stuttgart: W. Kohlhammer, 1888.
- ‘Friedrich August Rosen’. Allgemeine Deutsche Biographie 29 (1889) 192–195.
- ‘The Date of the Poet Māgha’. Vienna Oriental Journal / Wiener Zeitschrift für die Kunde des Morgenlandes 4 (1890) 61–71.
- ‘Die Handschriften-Verzeichnisse der Königlichen Bibliothek zu Berlin’. Centralblatt für Bibliothekswesen 7, 5 (1891) 177–196.
- ‘Specimen eines Jaina-Onomastikons (Vorgelegt von Hrn. Weber)’. Sitzungsberichte der Königlich Preussischen Akademie der Wissenschaften zu Berlin. Jahrgang XXII 1892. Erster Halbband. Januar bis Mai. Gesamtsitzung 21 April, 349–362. Berlin: Verlag der Königlichen Akademie der Wissenschaften, in Commission bei Georg Reimer, 1892a.
- Specimen of a literary-bibliographical Jaina-Onomasticon. (15 of the 55 pages were corrected by Ernst Leumann. With a preface in German by Albrecht Weber.) Leipzig: O. Harassowitz, 1892b.
- Jaina Onomasticon. Berlin 1893 (Manuscript bound in eight volumes. Hamburg, Institut für Indologie und Tibetologie).
- ‘The Samachari-Satakam of Samayasundara and Pattavalis of the Anchala-Gachcha and other Gachchas (Revised with Additions by Ernst Leumann)’. Indian Antiquary 23 (1894) 169–183.
