= Renate Tobies =

German mathematician and historian of mathematics

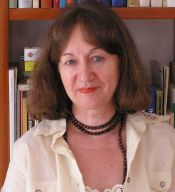
Renate Tobies

Renate A. Tobies (born January 25, 1947) is a German mathematician and historian of mathematics known for her biographies of Felix Klein and Iris Runge.

== Education and career ==
Tobies grew up in East Germany, and studied mathematics and chemistry at Leipzig University. She completed a doctoral dissertation (Dr. paed.) on the history of chemistry education, Die Entwicklung des allgemeinbildenden Chemieunterrichts auf dem Gebiet der DDR unter besonderer Berücksichtigung der ideologischen Erziehung (1945 bis zum VIII. Parteitag der SED), there in 1975. After briefly teaching pharmacy, she took a position in Leipzig's Institute for the History of Medicine and Natural Sciences, specializing in the history of mathematics. She completed her habilitation there, and earned a second doctorate (Dr.sc.) in 1986 with a dissertation Die gesellschaftliche Stellung deutscher mathematischer Organisationen und ihre Funktion bei der Veränderung der gesellschaftlichen Wirksamkeit der Mathematik (1871 - 1933).

The German reunification led to a drastic reduction in the size of the Leipzig institute, and in 1993 Tobies took a Sofja Kowalewskaja Visiting Professorship at the University of Kaiserslautern. After several additional visiting professorships at the Technical University of Braunschweig, University of Göttingen, University of Stuttgart, and University of Linz, she settled at the University of Jena until her retirement.

== Books ==
Tobies is the author or editor of books including:

- Felix Klein (Teubner, 1981)
- "Aller Männerkultur zum Trotz": Frauen in Mathematik, Naturwissenschaften und Technik [Despite the all-male culture: Women in mathematics, science, and technology] (Campus Verlag, 1997, reprinted 2008)
- Mathematik auf den Versammlungen der Gesellschaft Deutscher Naturforscher und Ärzte 1843–1890 [Mathematics at the meetings of the Society of German Naturalists and Physicians 1843–1890] (with Klaus Volkert, Wissenschaftliche Verlagsgesellschaft MBH, 1998)
- Brieftagebuch zwischen Max Planck, Carl Runge, Bernhard Karsten, und Adolf Leopold (ed. with Klaus Hentschel, ERS Verlag, 1999)
- Traumjob Mathematik! Berufswege von Frauen und Männern in der Mathematik [Dream job mathematics! Career paths of women and men in mathematics] (with Andrea Abele and Helmut Neunzert, Birkhäuser, 2004)
- Biographisches Lexikon in Mathematik promovierter Personen an deutschen Universitäten und Technischen Hochschulen WS 1907/08 bis WS 1944/45 [Biographical dictionary of persons graduated in mathematics at German universities and technical universities WS 1907/08 to WS 1944/45] (Erwin Rauner Verlag, 2006)
- Morgen möchte ich wieder 100 herrliche Sachen ausrechnen: Iris Runge bei Osram und Telefunken [Tomorrow I would like to calculate another 100 marvelous things: Iris Runge at Osram and Telefunken] (Franz Steiner Verlag, 2010), revised as Iris Runge: A Life at the Crossroads of Mathematics, Science, and Industry (Valentine A. Pakis, trans., Birkhäuser, 2012)
- Margarete Kahn und Klara Löbenstein: Mathematikerinnen – Studienrätinnen – Freundinnen (with York-Egbert König and Christina Prauss, Hentrich und Hentrich, 2011)
- Women in Industrial Research (ed. with Annette B. Vogt, Franz Steiner Verlag, 2014).

== Recognition ==
Tobies became a corresponding member of the International Academy of the History of Science in 2007.
