= Viktor von Weizsäcker =

German physician and physiologist

Viktor Freiherr von Weizsäcker (21 April 1886, in Stuttgart – 9 January 1957, in Heidelberg) was a German physician and physiologist. He was the brother of Ernst von Weizsäcker, and uncle to Richard von Weizsäcker and Carl Friedrich von Weizsäcker. (For his family tree, see Weizsäcker.)

He studied at Tübingen, Freiburg, Berlin, and Heidelberg, where he earned his medical degree in 1910. In 1920, he became head of the neurological department at Ludolf von Krehl's clinic in Heidelberg. In 1941, he succeeded Otfrid Foerster as professor of neurology in Breslau, and in 1945 returned to Heidelberg as a professor of clinical medicine.

Weizsäcker is known for his pioneer work in psychosomatic medicine and for his theories regarding medical anthropology. He is remembered for his concept of Gestaltkreis, an elaboration of Gestalt psychology, in which he explains that biological events are not fixed responses but are dependent upon previous experience and are constantly being repatterned through experience. Via Gestalt, Weizsäcker attempted to theoretically represent the unit of perception and movement.

In the late 1920s, Weizsäcker was co-editor of Die Kreatur with philosopher Martin Buber (1878-1965) and theologian Joseph Wittig (1879-1949). In this journal, Weizsäcker advances his ideas concerning medical anthropology. In 1956, he published Pathosophie, where he tried to create a philosophical understanding of man through his drives, conflicts, and illnesses.

== Published works ==
- "Der Gestaltkreis, Theorie der Einheit von Wahrnehmen und Bewegen", 1940.
- "Gestalt und Zeit : nach einem am 17. 1. 1942 gehaltenen Vortrage", 1942.
- "Begegnungen und Entscheidungen", 1949.
- "Menschenführung : nach ihren biologischen und metaphysischen Grundlagen betrachtet", 1955.
- "Am Anfang schuf Gott Himmel und Erde : Grundfragen der Naturphilosophie", 1954.
- "Natur und Geist; Errinnerungen eines Arztes", 1954.
- "Pathosophie", 1955.
