= Ceremonial weapon =

Object used for ceremonial displays of power or authority

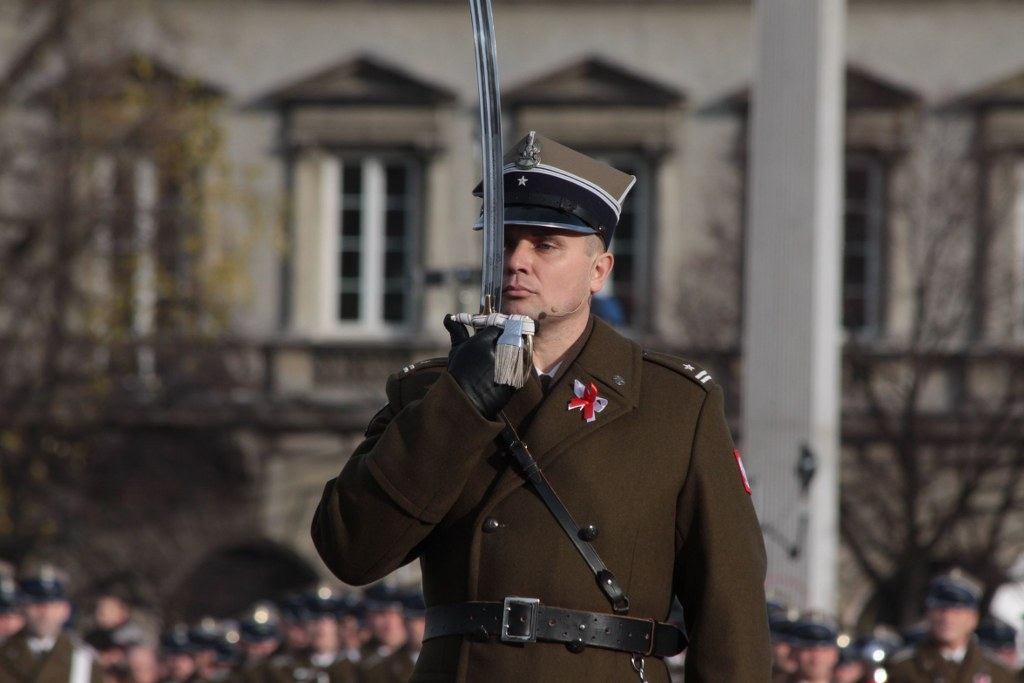
A Polish Land Forces major presenting his ceremonial sabre in salute.

A ceremonial weapon is an object used for ceremonial purposes to display power or authority. They may be used in parades and as part of military dress uniforms, or presented as gifts on formal occasions. Although they are descended from weapons used in actual combat, they are not normally used as such. Their form and, especially, their finishing and decoration are typically designed to show status and power and to be an impressive sight, rather than for practicality as a weapon. Quite often, ceremonial weapons are constructed with precious metals or other materials that make them too delicate for combat use. With ceremonial swords, an example of this is that the sword may be poorly balanced. Historically, however, many ceremonial weapons were also capable of actual combat, most notably in the military.

Maces, halberds, daggers, and swords are the most common form of ceremonial weapons, but in theory almost any weapon can become ceremonial. The Sergeant at Arms in some parliaments carries a ceremonial mace. The Swiss Guard in the Vatican carry both ceremonial weapons (halberds and swords) and 21st century weapons (semi-automatic pistols). Mid-20th century rifles such as the American M14 and the Russian SKS, fitted with polished wood stocks, chrome plating and other decorative finishes, are common ceremonial weapons for honor guard units.

Another example is the use of a firearm to signal the start of a race. Guns are also used in celebratory gunfire.

== By country ==
=== United Kingdom ===
Officers of the Armed Forces are issued the Pattern 1897 infantry officer's sword, used for ceremonial occasions.

== Examples ==
- Baton
- Buława
- Ceremonial mace
- Drill purpose rifle
- Gunbai
- Honorary weapon
- Honorary Revolutionary Weapon
- Indonesian ceremonial bronze axes
- Kirpan
- Pace stick
- Staff of office
- Swagger stick
- Sword of Islam (Mussolini)
- Sword of justice
- Sword of Saint Wenceslas – the coronation sword of Bohemia
- Sword of state
- Tumi
- Vine staff
- Weapons of Honour (French)
