= List of titles and honours of Arthur Wellesley, 1st Duke of Wellington =

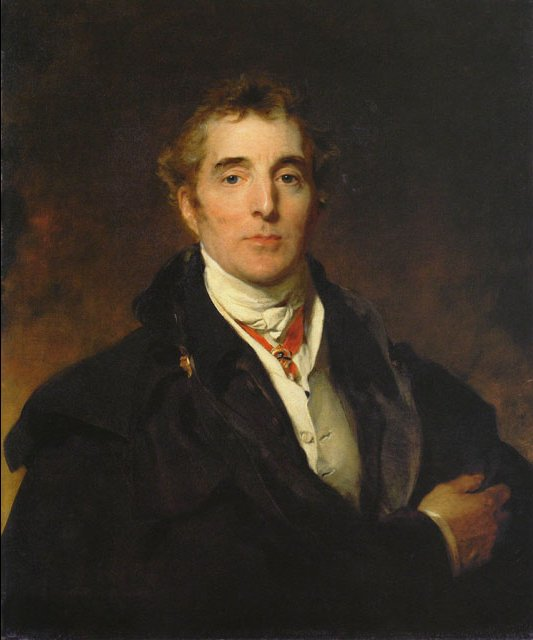
Arthur Wellesley, painted by Sir Thomas Lawrence

Arthur Wellesley, 1st Duke of Wellington KG, GCB, GCH, PC, FRS, RMWO (1 May 1769 – 14 September 1852) was an Anglo-Irish soldier and statesman and one of the leading military and political figures of the 19th century. His military career culminated at the Battle of Waterloo, where, along with Blücher, he defeated the forces of Napoleon. He was also twice Tory Prime Minister of the United Kingdom. During his life, Wellington received numerous honours, titles and awards throughout his career as a statesman and soldier. These include awards, statues and monuments, as well as buildings and places named after him.

== Funeral ==
At his funeral Wellesley's style was proclaimed (laid out in the following order and format in the London Gazette):

Arthur, Duke and Marquess of Wellington,
Marquess Douro, Earl of Wellington,
Viscount Wellington and Baron Douro,
Knight of the Most Noble Order of the Garter,
Knight Grand Cross of The Most Honourable Order of the Bath,
One of Her Majesty's Most Honourable Privy Council, and
Field Marshal and Commander-in-Chief of Her Majesty's Forces.
Field Marshal of the Austrian Army,
Field Marshal of the Hanoverian Army,
Field Marshal of the Army of the Netherlands,
Marshal-General of the Portuguese Army,
Field Marshal of the Prussian Army,
Field Marshal of the Russian Army,
and
Captain-General of the Spanish Army.
Prince of Waterloo, of the Kingdom of the Netherlands, Duke of Ciudad Rodrigo
and Grandee of Spain of the First Class.
Duke of Victoria, Marquess of Torres Vedras, and Count of Vimiera in Portugal.
Knight of the Most Illustrious Order of the Golden Fleece, and of the Military Orders
of St. Ferdinand and of St. Hermenigilde of Spain.
Knight Grand Cross of the Orders of the Black Eagle and of the Red Eagle of Prussia.
Knight Grand Cross of the Imperial Military Order of Maria Teresa of Austria.
Knight of the Imperial Orders of St. Andrew, St. Alexander Newski, and St. George of Russia.
Knight Grand Cross of the Royal Portuguese Military Order of the Tower and Sword.
Knight Grand Cross of the Royal and Military Order of the Sword of Sweden.
Knight of the Order of St. Esprit of France.
Knight of the Order of the Elephant of Denmark.
Knight Grand Cross of the Royal Hanoverian Guelphic Order.
Knight of the Order of St. Januarius and of the Military Order of St. Ferdinand and
of Merit of the Two Sicilies.
Knight Grand Cross of the Supreme Order of the Annunciation of Savoy.
Knight Grand Cross of the Royal Military Order of Maximilian Joseph of Bavaria.
Knight of the Royal Order of the Rue Crown of Saxony,
Knight Grand Cross of the Order of Military Merit of Wurtemberg.
Knight Grand Cross of the Military Order of William of the Netherlands.
Knight of the Order of the Golden Lion of Hesse Cassel,
and
Knight Grand Cross of the Orders of Fidelity and of the Lion of Baden.

== Arms ==
Wellington's coat of arms

Wellington's arms were given, effective August 1814, an augmentation of honour of the union badge of the United Kingdom to commemorate his services. He bore, Quarterly, I and IV gules, a cross argent, in each quarter five plates of the same; II and III, Or, a lion rampant gules, armed and langued azure. For augmentation, an inescutcheon charged with the crosses of St. George, St. Andrew, and St. Patrick combined, being the union badge of the United Kingdom.

== Titles, honours and styles ==
=== Peerage of the United Kingdom ===
- Baron Douro of Wellesley in the County of Somerset – 26 August 1809
- Viscount Wellington of Talavera, and of Wellington in the County of Somerset – 26 August 1809
- Earl of Wellington – 28 February 1812
- Marquess of Wellington – 18 August 1812
- Marquess Douro – 3 May 1814
- Duke of Wellington – 3 May 1814

His brother William selected the name Wellington for its similarity to the family surname of Wellesley, which derives from the village of Wellesley in Somerset, not far from that of Wellington.

Since he did not return to England until the Peninsular War was over, he was awarded all his patents of nobility and was introduced to the House of Lords as a Baron, Viscount, Earl, Marquess and Duke in a single day.

=== British and Irish honours ===
- Knight of the Bath – 1804
- Privy Counsellor of Ireland – 28 April 1807
- Peninsular Cross with nine Medal bars for all campaigns, the only one so issued – 1810 (Displayed at Apsley House)
- Privy Counsellor of the United Kingdom – 1812
- Knight of the Garter – 4 March 1813
- Colonel of the Royal Regiment of Horse Guards – 1813-27
- Knight Grand Cross of the Bath (military) – 2 January 1815
- Waterloo Medal – 1816 (Displayed at Apsley House)
- Governor of Plymouth – 1819-26
- Lord Lieutenant of Hampshire – 1820
- Colonel-in-Chief of the Rifle Brigade – 1820
- Lord High Constable of England – 1821, 1831, 1838
- Constable of the Tower – 1826
- Colonel of the Grenadier Guards – 1827
- Commander-in-Chief – 1827-28, 1842
- Governor of Charterhouse School – 1828
- Lord Warden of the Cinque Ports – 1829
- Chancellor of the University of Oxford – 1834
- Master of Trinity House – 1837
- Honorary Member of the Institution of Civil Engineers – 1842
- Fellow of the Royal Society – 1847
- Ranger of Hyde Park – 1847
- Ranger of St James's Park – 1850

Honours held for life unless stated.

The Duke of Wellington stood as godfather to Queen Victoria's seventh child, Prince Arthur, in 1850. Prince Arthur was also born on the first of May; and as a toddler, young Arthur was encouraged to remind people that the Duke of Wellington was his godfather.

=== International ===
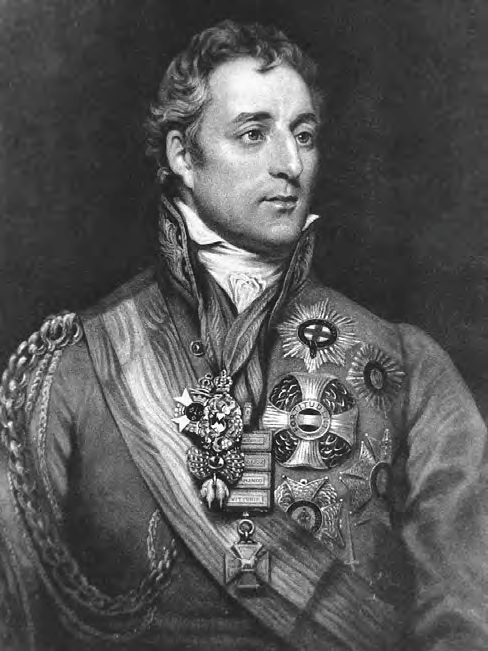
The Duke of Wellington wearing several decorations. Neck badges: i) Order of the Sword ii) Order of the Golden Fleece iii) Peninsular Cross with four bars • Stars on the left breast: i) Order of the Garter ii) Order of Saint George iii) Order of Maria Theresa iv) Military Order of Saint Ferdinand v) Order of the Tower and Sword vi) Order of the Sword • Sash over his right shoulder: Order of Maria Theresa

==== Noble titles ====
- Portugal:
  - Count of Vimeira – 18 October 1811
  - Marquess of Torres Vedras – August 1812
  - Duke of Victoria – 18 December 1812
- Spain: Duke of Ciudad Rodrigo, Grandee of the 1st Class – January 1812
- Netherlands: Prince of Waterloo – 18 July 1815
- Belgium: Prince of Waterloo – 1831

==== Honours ====
- Portugal: Knight Grand Cross of the Tower and Sword – 18 October 1811
- Spain:
  - Knight Grand Cross of the Military Order of St. Ferdinand – 11 April 1812
  - Knight of the Golden Fleece – 7 August 1812
  - Knight of the Order of Charles III – 1814
  - Knight Grand Cross of the Military Order of St. Hermenegild – 1817
- Sweden: Knight Grand Cross of the Sword, 1st Class – 26 February 1814
- Austria: Knight Grand Cross of the Military Order of Maria Theresa – 4 March 1814
- Russia:
  - Knight of St. George, 1st Class – 28 April 1814
  - Knight of St. Andrew – 8 July 1815
  - Knight of St. Alexander Nevsky – 8 July 1815
  - Knight of St. Anna, 1st Class – 8 July 1815
- Prussia:
  - Knight of the Black Eagle – 26 June 1815
  - Knight Grand Cross of the Red Eagle
- Denmark: Knight of the Elephant – 4 July 1815
- Sardinia: Knight of the Annunciation, with Collar – 7 July 1815
- Netherlands: Knight Grand Cross of the Military William Order – 8 July 1815
- Saxony: Knight of the Rue Crown – 27 July 1815
- Baden:
  - Knight Grand Cross of the House Order of Fidelity – July 1815
  - Knight Grand Cross of the Zähringer Lion
- Bavaria: Knight Grand Cross of the Military Order of Max Joseph – 16 October 1815
- France: Knight of the Holy Spirit – 27 November 1815
- Hesse-Kassel: Knight Grand Cross of the Golden Lion – 11 December 1815
- Württemberg: Knight Grand Cross of the Military Merit Order – 1815; with Blue Band – 1830
- Hanover: Knight Grand Cross of the Royal Hanoverian Guelphic Order – March 1816
- Two Sicilies:
  - Knight of St. Januarius – 16 July 1817
  - Knight Grand Cross of St. Ferdinand and Merit – 16 July 1817

==== Military rank ====
The nations of Austria, Hanover, the Netherlands, Portugal, Prussia, Russia and Spain gave him their highest military rank:

- Marshal-General of the Portuguese Army – 6 July 1809
- Captain-General of the Spanish Army – 8 August 1809
- Field Marshal of the Hanoverian Army – 21 June 1813
- Field Marshal of the Army of the Netherlands – 7 May 1815
- Field Marshal of the Austrian Army – 15 November 1818
- Field Marshal of the Prussian Army – 15 November 1818
- Field Marshal of the Russian Army – 15 November 1818

Each nation presented him with a baton as a symbol of his rank (see Batons of Arthur Wellesley, 1st Duke of Wellington)

=== Styles ===
In the United Kingdom

- The Hon Arthur Wellesley (birth–1 May 1769)
- Ensign The Hon Arthur Wellesley (7 March–25 December 1787)
- Lt The Hon Arthur Wellesley (25 December 1787 – 30 June 1791)
- Capt The Hon Arthur Wellesley (30 June 1791 – 30 April 1793)
- Maj The Hon Arthur Wellesley (30 April–30 September 1793)
- Lt-Col The Hon Arthur Wellesley (30 September 1793 – 3 May 1796)
- Col The Hon Arthur Wellesley (3 May 1796 – 19 May 1798)
- Col The Hon Arthur Wellesley (19 May 1798 – 29 April 1802)
- Maj-Gen The Hon Arthur Wellesley (29 April 1802 – 1 September 1804)
- Maj-Gen The Hon Sir Arthur Wellesley KB (1 September 1804 – 8 April 1807)
- Maj-Gen The Rt Hon Sir Arthur Wellesley KB (8 April 1807 – 25 April 1808)
- Lt-Gen The Rt Hon Sir Arthur Wellesley KB (25 April 1808 – 4 September 1809)
- Lt-Gen The Rt Hon The Viscount Wellington KB PC (4 September 1809–May 1811)
- Gen The Rt Hon The Viscount Wellington KB PC (May 1811–28 February 1812)
- Gen The Rt Hon The Earl of Wellington KB PC (28 February–3 October 1812)
- Gen The Most Hon The Marquess of Wellington KB PC (3 October 1812 – 4 March 1813)
- Gen The Most Hon The Marquess of Wellington KG KB PC (4 March–21 June 1813)
- FM The Most Hon The Marquess of Wellington KG KB PC (21 June 1813 – 11 May 1814)
- FM His Grace The Duke of Wellington KG KB PC (11 May 1814 – 2 January 1815)
- FM His Grace The Duke of Wellington KG GCB PC (2 January 1815 – 14 September 1852)
- FM His Grace The Duke of Wellington KG GCB GCH PC (1816–14 September 1852)
- FM His Grace The Duke of Wellington KG GCB GCH PC FRS (1847–14 September 1852)

In the Netherlands

- Zijne Doorluchtigheid de Prins van Waterloo (18 July 1815 – 14 September 1852)

In Spain

- Excelentísimo Señor Arthur Wesley, Duque de Ciudad Rodrigo, Grande de España, Caballero de la Orden del Toisón de Oro (January 1812–14 September 1852).

In Portugal

- Sua Excelência o Duque da Vitória (18 December 1812 – 14 September 1852)

== Military promotions and dates of rank ==
Ranks up to Lieutenant Colonel were obtained by purchasing commissions, subject to minimum service periods. The army did not allow ranks from Colonel and above to be purchased, so they were obtained through promotion only.

Rank	Position/regiment	Date	How obtained	Ref.
Ensign	73rd Regiment of Foot	7 March 1787	Appointed	
Lieutenant	76th Regiment of Foot	25 December 1787	Promoted	
Lieutenant	41st Regiment of Foot	23 January 1788	Exchange	
Lieutenant	12th Light Dragoons	25 June 1789	Appointed	
Captain	58th Regiment of Foot	30 June 1791	Promoted	
Captain	18th Light Dragoons	31 October 1792	Appointed	
Major	33rd Regiment of Foot	30 April 1793	Purchased	
Lieutenant-Colonel	33rd Regiment of Foot	30 September 1793	Purchased	
Brevet Colonel	Army	3 May 1796	Promoted	
Brigadier-General	Egypt	17 July 1801	Local rank	
Major-General	Army	29 April 1802	Promoted	
Lieutenant-General	Army	25 April 1808	Promoted	
General	Spain & Portugal	31 July 1811	Local rank	
Field Marshal	Army	21 June 1813	Promoted	

== Namesakes ==
=== Places ===
Great Britain

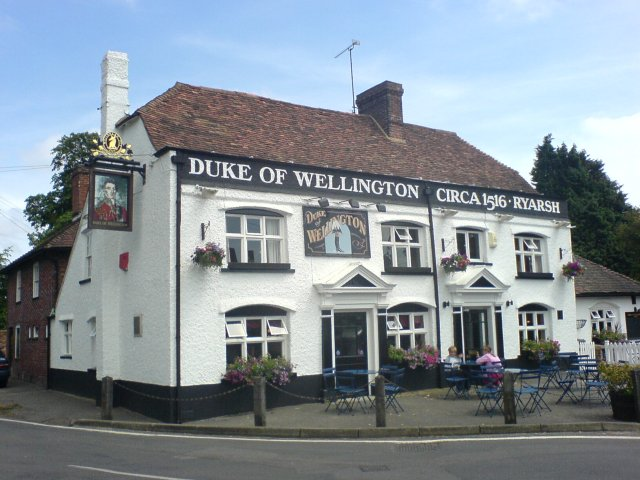
The Duke of Wellington pub, Ryarsh

- Wellington College, Berkshire, a senior boarding- and day-school in England, was built in memory of the Duke, under the orders of Queen Victoria. To this day, all the boarding houses are named after the generals who fought alongside him at Battle of Waterloo, including Gebhard Leberecht von Blücher, Viscount Beresford, Sir Thomas Picton, Baron Lynedoch, and The Prince of Orange. The Queen laid the foundation stone in 1856 and inaugurated the School's opening on 29 January 1859. On 4 May 2007, the school held a memorial service for the Iron Duke at St Paul's Cathedral, London, to commemorate his birthday.
- Wellington Barracks
- Some pubs are named after the Duke, including The Duke of Wellington, Marylebone, Duke of Wellington, Belgravia and Duke of Wellington, Bethnal Green.
- In addition, a large number of cities and towns in Great Britain have a Wellington Road, Avenue, Street or Square. Considering the number of towns where this is the case, it would be impractical to attempt to list them all here.

Ireland

- Wellington Road in the Ballsbridge area of Dublin.
- Wellington Road on the North side of Cork city.
- Wellington College Belfast in Northern Ireland, a Co-Educational Grammar School in Belfast, was named after Wellington. Wellington is also a Senior Boys' house at the Duke of York's Royal Military School, where, like Welbeck College, all houses are named after prominent military figures.
- Wellington Park in central Belfast. Running parallel to this street is Wellesley Avenue.

Australia

- Mount Wellington, which overlooks Hobart, the capital of the state of Tasmania, Australia, is named after Wellesley. Additionally, Hobart also has Salamanca Place, a row of convict built warehouses which dominate the wharf area of the city, named after the Battle of Salamanca (also known as the Battle of Aripiles) which took place in July 1812. Behind Salamanca Place, which is now an arts, restaurant hub, plus the home of the Salamanca Market, is the riverside suburb of Battery Point. A walk through the area will see streets and crescents named after Napoleon, Waterloo and Arthur's Circus where colonial cottages front a small roundabout. And to add to the links, on Macquarie St sits the Duke of Wellington Hotel with imposing signage of the Iron Duke himself gazing down on all who pass beneath.
- Wellington Square in the Adelaide suburb of North Adelaide, South Australia, named for Wellington because he is credited with securing the passage of the South Australia Foundation Act through the British House of Lords.
- The former County of Douro in Victoria, Gipps District, was named in Wellington's honour and was bordered to the west by the County of Mornington. The former County of Douro was found on Victorian maps from 1845 and last appeared on a Victorian map in 1864. Further references to Wellington can be found locally in the naming of Waterloo Bay and Cape Wellington and Lake Wellington. The county was incorporated into the new County of Buln Buln in 1871. The County of Mornington proclaimed in 1849, is incidentally named after the title of Garret Wesley, 1st Earl of Mornington, Arthur Wellesley's father.
- Wellington Square, Perth
- Wellington, New South Wales
- Duke of Wellington Hotel, Melbourne

New Zealand

- The capital city of New Zealand, Wellington, was named after him. It forms part of the Wellington Region, formerly part of Wellington Province. Greater Wellington has a private primary school named Wellesley College, and the central city had a private club, the Wellesley Club now merged with the senior Wellington Club founded December 1841 and New Zealand's oldest private club.
- The city of Auckland has a central-city road named Wellesley Street. A volcanic cone and its associated suburb in the city bear the name Mount Wellington.

Canada

- Wellington County, Ontario, the county surrounding the city of Guelph.
- The village of Wellington, a community located in Prince Edward County, Ontario.
- The town of Wellington on Vancouver Island, now a neighbourhood of Nanaimo, British Columbia, as well as Mount Wellington which is located about 70 miles (113 km) north of the town.
- Wellington Street in Ottawa, the street upon which the Parliament Buildings, Canada's seat of government are located.
- Both Wellington Street and Wellesley Street are principal downtown streets in Toronto, Ontario, Canada. Wellesley subway station takes its name from the street.
- Wellington railway station in Nanaimo, British Columbia
- Wellington Dyke, a large agricultural dyke across the Canard River in Kings County, Nova Scotia
- Wellington Gate and Wellington Barracks at CFB Halifax
- Fort Wellington, in Prescott, Ontario
- Wellington—Halton Hills, a Canadian electoral district
- Wellington, Prince Edward Island
- Wellington Parish, New Brunswick
- Wellington, Nova Scotia

Other countries

- Wellington Barracks, Hong Kong
- Wellington Street, Hong Kong
- India: The town of Wellington in the Nilgiri Hills district of Tamil Nadu, is the home of the Wellington Cantonment, a prestigious Indian military establishment, and college. It is near Coonoor on the Nilgiri Mountain Railway.
- Mount Wellington, a mountain located in Otsego County, New York, is named after him.
- Wellington, a town in South Africa, was named after him by Sir George Napier.
- Hippodrome Wellington
- Wellington Heights, East Los Angeles, CA
- Wellington Street in various other cities

=== Military units ===
Wellington died in 1852 and in the following year Queen Victoria, in recognition of the 33rd foot regiment's long ties to him, ordered that the 33rd foot regiment's title be changed to The Duke of Wellington's Regiment.

=== Ships ===
HMS Duke of Wellington, a 131 gun first-rate ship of the line was named after the first Duke of Wellington. HMS Iron Duke, named after Wellington, was the flagship of Admiral Sir John Jellicoe at the Battle of Jutland in World War I, one of three so named in the Royal Navy.

TSS Duke of York (1935), a steamer temporarily renamed Duke of Wellington.

=== Aircraft ===
Wellington is the only person to have the honour of having not one but two Royal Air Force bombers named for him - the Vickers Wellesley and the Vickers Wellington, and at a time when the convention was for British bombers to be named after landlocked cities.

=== Locomotives ===
Great Western Railways "Iron Duke" Class locomotives were named after Wellington, including one of the 1847 originals which was named "Iron Duke" and lent its name to the class. It was withdrawn in 1871, and a replica built in 1985 for the National Railway Museum to exhibit.

=== Banknotes ===
The Duke of Wellington's picture featured on the reverse of Series D (Pictorial Series) £5 banknotes issued by the Bank of England (11 November 1971 – 29 November 1991), along with a scene from the Battle of Waterloo. Wellington was the first non-Englishman to appear on an English banknote.

=== Food and drink ===
Beef Wellington gets its name from the general and prime minister. Ironically, his favourite meat was mutton.

Wellington's likeness appears on the beer labels of the beer brewed by Wellington Brewery in Guelph, Ontario, and the beer "Iron Duke Strong Ale" was named in his honour.

=== Clothing ===
His name was given to Wellington boots, a type of high, originally leather, boots, after the custom-made boots he wore instead of traditional Hessian boots.

The Wellington hat was a style of beaver-fur hat.

== Freedom of the City ==
British Empire

- (England) 1815: London
- (England) 1819: Plymouth
- (England) 1827: York
