= Cultural depictions of Arthur Wellesley, 1st Duke of Wellington =

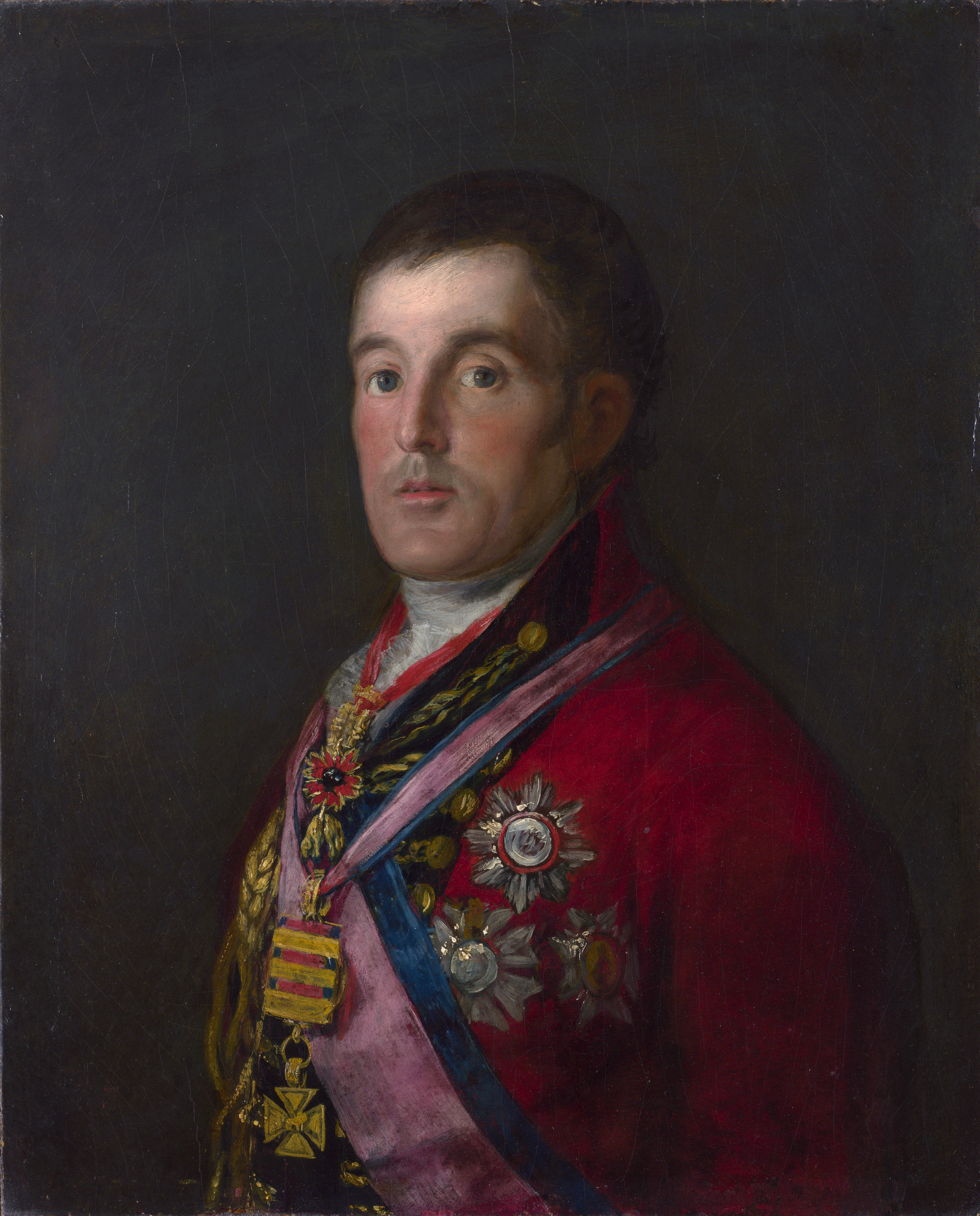
Portrait of the Duke of Wellington by Francisco Goya (1812–1814)

Arthur Wellesley, 1st Duke of Wellington, was an Anglo-Irish soldier and Tory statesman who was one of the leading military and political figures of 19th-century Britain, commanding the British Army during the Napoleonic Wars and serving twice as prime minister. He has frequently been depicted in various cultural media.

== Art ==
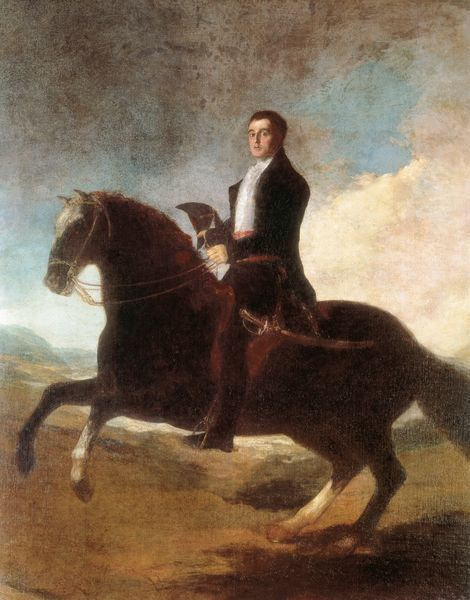
Equestrian Portrait of the 1st Duke of Wellington by Francisco Goya (1812)

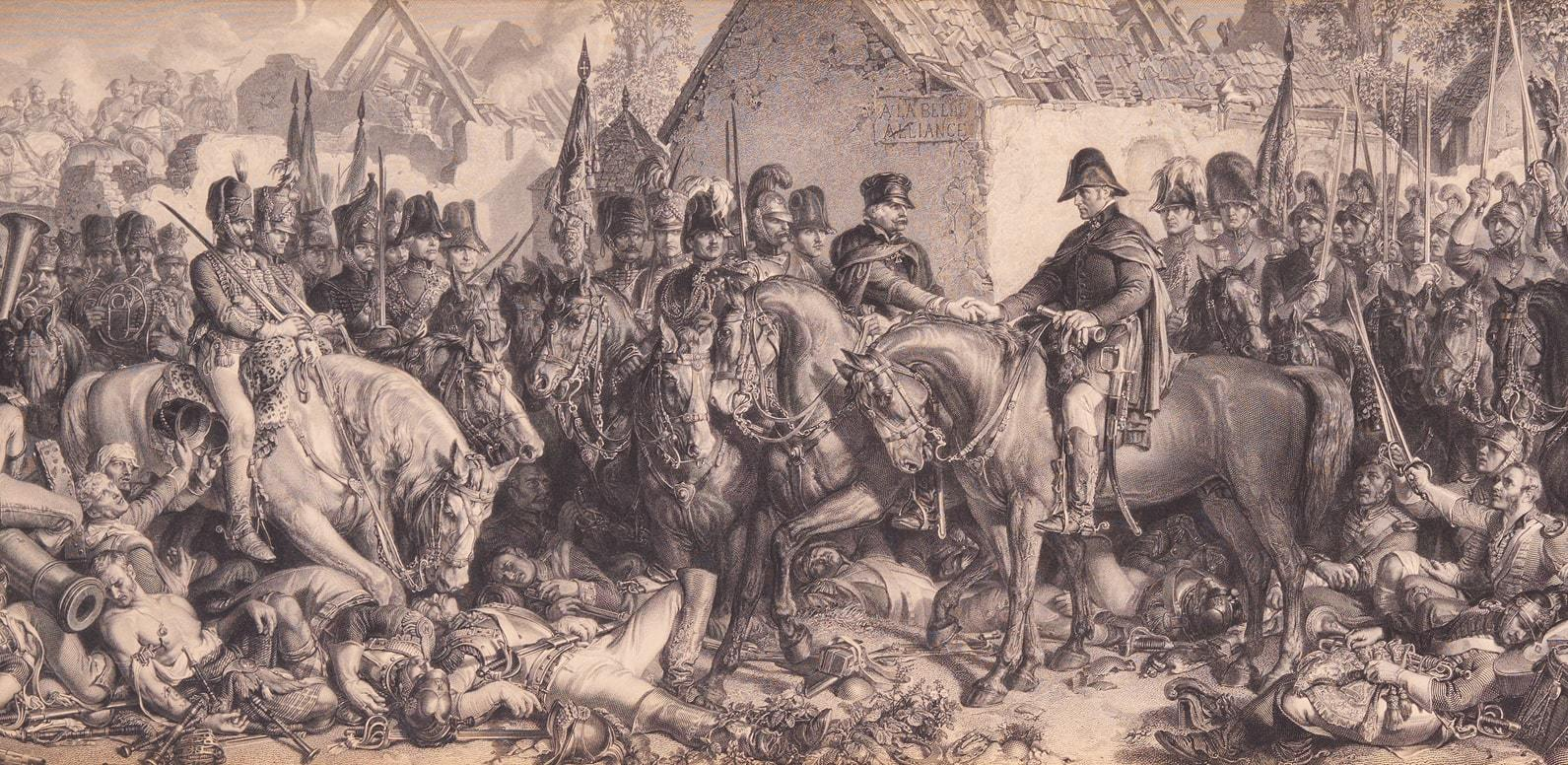
The central section of The Meeting of Wellington and Blücher after the Battle of Waterloo, in a print of 1879

- Equestrian Portrait of the 1st Duke of Wellington by Francisco Goya (1812).
- Portrait of the Duke of Wellington by Francisco Goya (1812–1814).
- The Battle of Waterloo by William Sadler II (1815).
- Portrait of the Duke of Wellington by Thomas Lawrence (c.1815)
- Allegory of Waterloo by James Ward (1821).
- Arthur Wellesley, 1st Duke of Wellington by Thomas Lawrence (1829).
- The Duke of Wellington Describing the Field of Waterloo to George IV by Benjamin Robert Haydon (1840).
- A Dialogue at Waterloo by Edwin Landseer (1850).
- The Meeting of Wellington and Blücher after the Battle of Waterloo by Daniel Maclise (1861).
- Pubs named after the Duke of Wellington sometimes display a signboard with a portrait of the Duke.

== Literature ==
Literary works in which Arthur Wellesley, 1st Duke of Wellington, appears:

- The Vision of Don Roderick by Sir Walter Scott (1811).
- Moby-Dick by Herman Melville (1851).
- The Trumpet-Major by Thomas Hardy (1880).
- The Great Shadow by Sir Arthur Conan Doyle (1892).
- Death to the French by C.S. Forester (1932).
- An Infamous Army by Georgette Heyer (1937).
- Horatio Hornblower series by C.S. Forester (1937–1967).
- He Walked Around the Horses by H. Beam Piper (1948).
- Sharpe series by Bernard Cornwell (1981–2021).
- Jonathan Strange and Mr Norrell by Susanna Clarke (2004).
- World Game by Terrance Dicks (2005).
- Wellington and Napoleon Quartet series by Simon Scarrow (2006–2010).
- Victory of Eagles by Naomi Novik (2008).

== Film ==
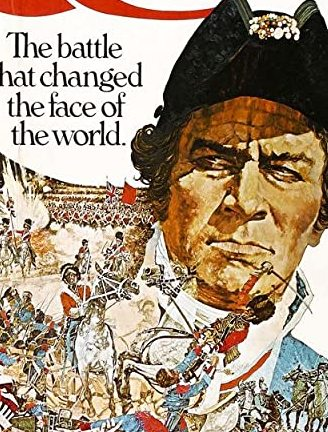
Waterloo (1970) poster showing Christopher Plummer as Wellington

- The Battle of Waterloo (1913), portrayed by Jack Brighton.
- Waterloo (1929), portrayed by Humberston Wright.
- Napoleon at Saint Helena (1929), portrayed by Günther Hadank.
- Congress Dances (1932), portrayed by Humberston Wright.
- The Iron Duke (1934), portrayed by George Arliss.
- The House of Rothschild (1934), portrayed by C. Aubrey Smith.
- Victoria the Great (1937), portrayed by James Dale.
- The Firefly (1937), portrayed by Matthew Boulton.
- Sixty Glorious Years (1938), portrayed by C. Aubrey Smith.
- The Rothschilds (1940), portrayed by Waldemar Leitgeb.
- Waterloo (1970), portrayed by Christopher Plummer.
- The Adventures of Gerard (1970), portrayed by John Neville.
- Lady Caroline Lamb (1972), portrayed by Laurence Olivier.
- Blackadder: Back and Forth (1999), portrayed by Stephen Fry.
- The Young Victoria (2009), portrayed by Julian Glover.
- Lines of Wellington (2012), portrayed by John Malkovich.
- Napoleon (2023), portrayed by Rupert Everett.
- Untitled Napoleon film by Nippon Animation (TBA) played by unknown.

== Radio ==
- Portrayed by Richard Durden in the BBC Radio 4 dramas The Hanoverian Handicap (1986) and The King's Wife (1988)
- Portrayed by John Rowe as an adult and Alistair White as a boy in the 1990 BBC Radio 4 drama Nosey!, produced to celebrate the 175th anniversary of the Battle of Waterloo
- Portrayed by Michael Pennington in the two-part 1993 BBC Radio 4 drama The Other Side of the Hill
- Portrayed by Simon Paisley Day in the 2015 BBC Radio 4 drama Waterloo - The Ball at Brussels

== Television ==
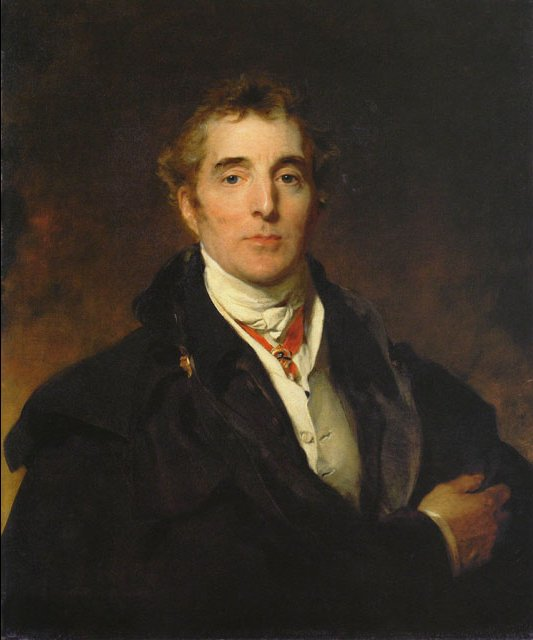
Arthur Wellesley, painted by Sir Thomas Lawrence

- Portrayed by John le Mesurier in a 1972 episode of Dad's Army, entitled A Soldier's Farewell.
- Portrayed by John Welsh in the first episode of the series Edward the Seventh, released in 1975.
- Portrayed by Bernard Archard in the 1983 series Number 10.
- Portrayed by Stephen Fry in a 1987 episode of Blackadder the Third, entitled Duel and Duality, and in the Blackadder special Blackadder: Back & Forth.
- Portrayed by Jeremy Young in the 1993 series Scarlet and Black.
- Portrayed by David Troughton and Hugh Fraser between 1993 and 1997 in the series Sharpe.
- Portrayed by Peter Davison in an episode of the 1999 series The Nearly Complete and Utter History of Everything.
- Portrayed by Ronan Vibert in the 2015 series Jonathan Strange & Mr Norrell.
- Portrayed by Peter Bowles in Victoria between 2016 and 2019.

== Music ==
- Wellington's Victory by Ludwig van Beethoven (1813).

== Video games ==
Video games Arthur Wellesley, 1st Duke of Wellington, appears in:

- Waterloo (1989).
- Risk II (2000).
- Empire Earth (2001).

== Miscellaneous ==
- Wellington is played by Granville Saxton in The Curse of Davros, a Big Finish Productions audio drama based on the long-running British science fiction television series Doctor Who, released in 2012.
- The Duke of Wellington's war horse Copenhagen is played by Daniel Rigby in BBC Radio 4's Warhorses of Letters, "the world's first epistolary equine love story", a comic exchange of letters between Copenhagen and Napoleon's horse Marengo (played by Stephen Fry). The comedy ran for three series.
- The story of the theft of the Goya Portrait of the Duke of Wellington by bus driver Kempton Bunton in 1962 and the following trial of Bunton was dramatised in the film The Duke, released in 2022, and the 2015 BBC Radio 4 drama Kempton and the Duke.
- Wellington also features in the 1976 board wargame Napoleon's Last Battles.

== See also ==
- Arms, titles, honours and styles of Arthur Wellesley, 1st Duke of Wellington
- Batons of Arthur Wellesley, 1st Duke of Wellington
- List of monuments to Arthur Wellesley, 1st Duke of Wellington
