= Staff of office =

Stick denoting position, rank or prestige

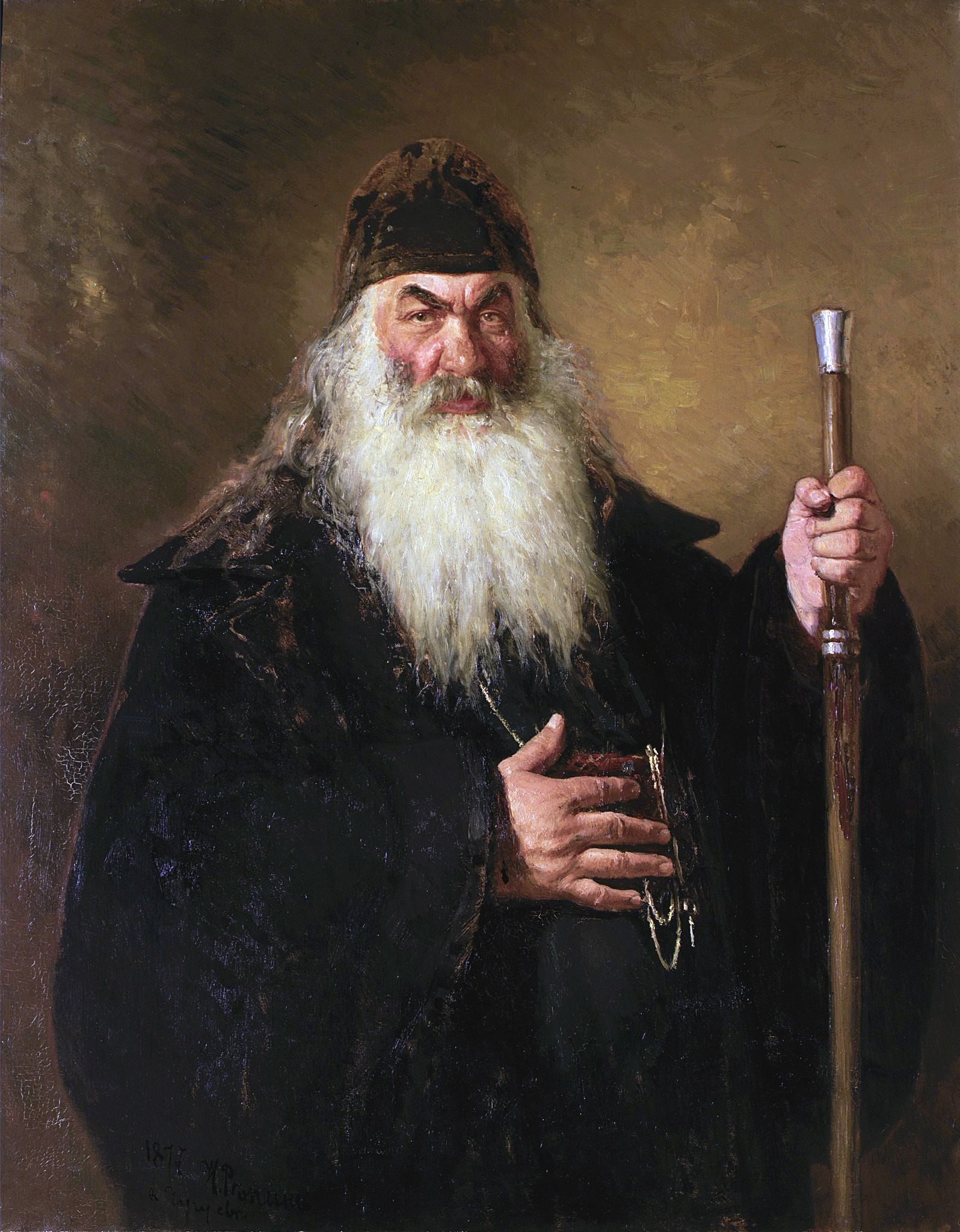
Orthodox protodeacon holding a walking stick. Portrait by Ilya Repin, 1877 (Tretyakov Gallery, Moscow).

A staff of office is a staff, the carrying of which often denotes an official's position, a social rank or a degree of social prestige.

Apart from the ecclesiastical and ceremonial usages mentioned below, there are less formal usages. A gold- or silver-topped cane can express social standing (or dandyism). Teachers or prefects in schools traditionally carried less elaborate canes which marked their right (and potential threat) to administer canings, and military officers carry a residual threat of physical punishment in their swagger sticks. Orchestral conductors have in their batons symbols of authority as well as tools of their trade.

== Ecclesiastical use ==
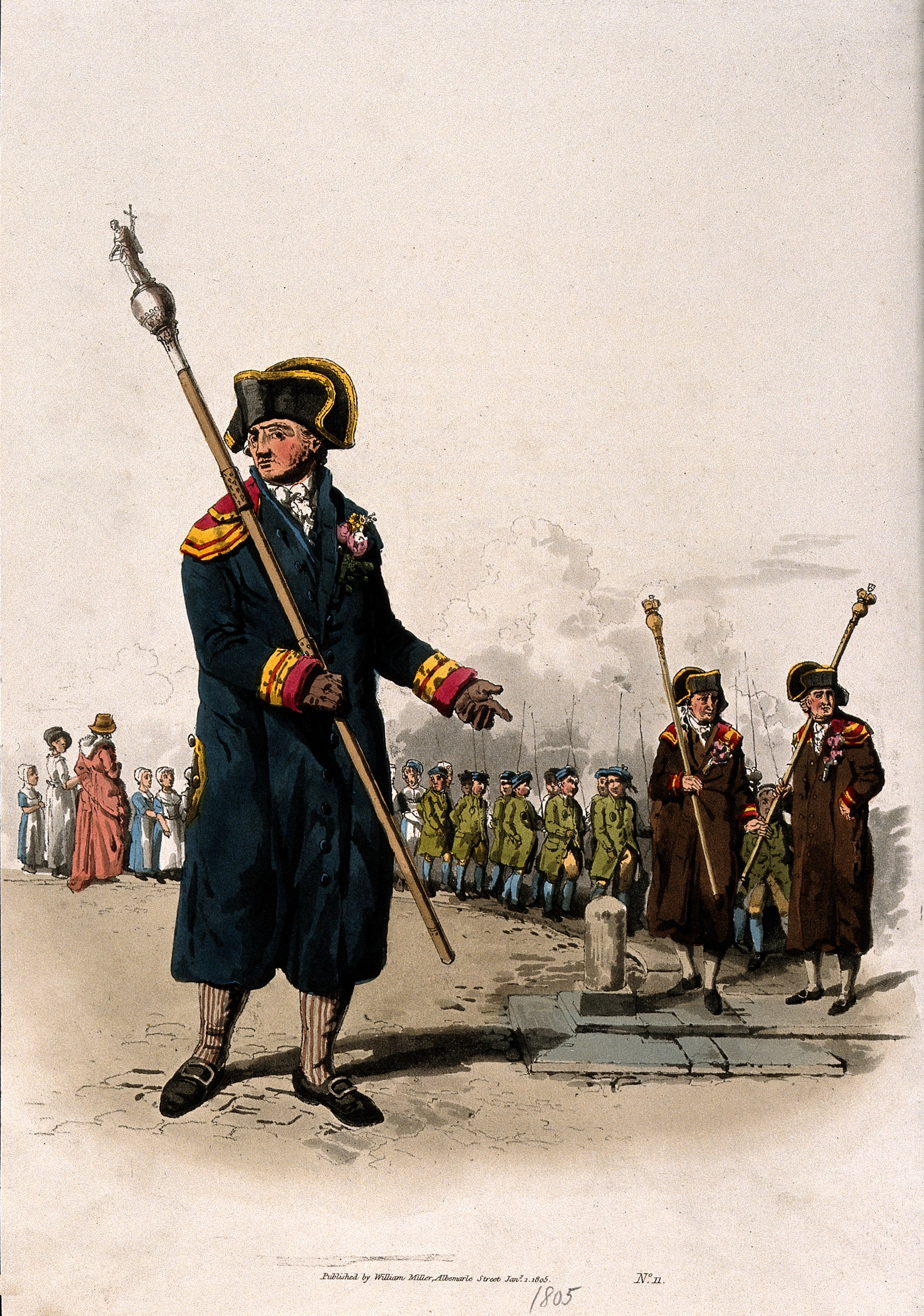
A beadle, carrying his staff; and behind him two churchwardens with staves (coloured aquatint, 1805).

Churchwardens (and sometimes sidesmen) traditionally carry staves or wands on special occasions as an emblem of their office.

In the Eastern Orthodox Church and some of the Oriental Orthodox Churches an ecclesiastical walking stick is used by bishops, archimandrites and hegumens (abbots) when walking outside. It is usually made of dark wood and is straight, rather than having a curved handle. The walking stick used by bishops and archimandrites is normally adorned with a silver grip at the top and a metal ferrule at the tip. The walking stick used by a hegumen or hegumenia (abbess) is normally of plain wood, unadorned. The walking stick is not used in any liturgical context, except to the extent that when a bishop is formally received at the beginning of the service, he will carry it as he walks into the church. An altar server will usually take it from him when he enters the narthex and return it to him when he leaves at the end of the service.

Western bishops may use a crozier or crook in a liturgical setting as a symbol of their pastoral authority.

== State and ceremonial use ==
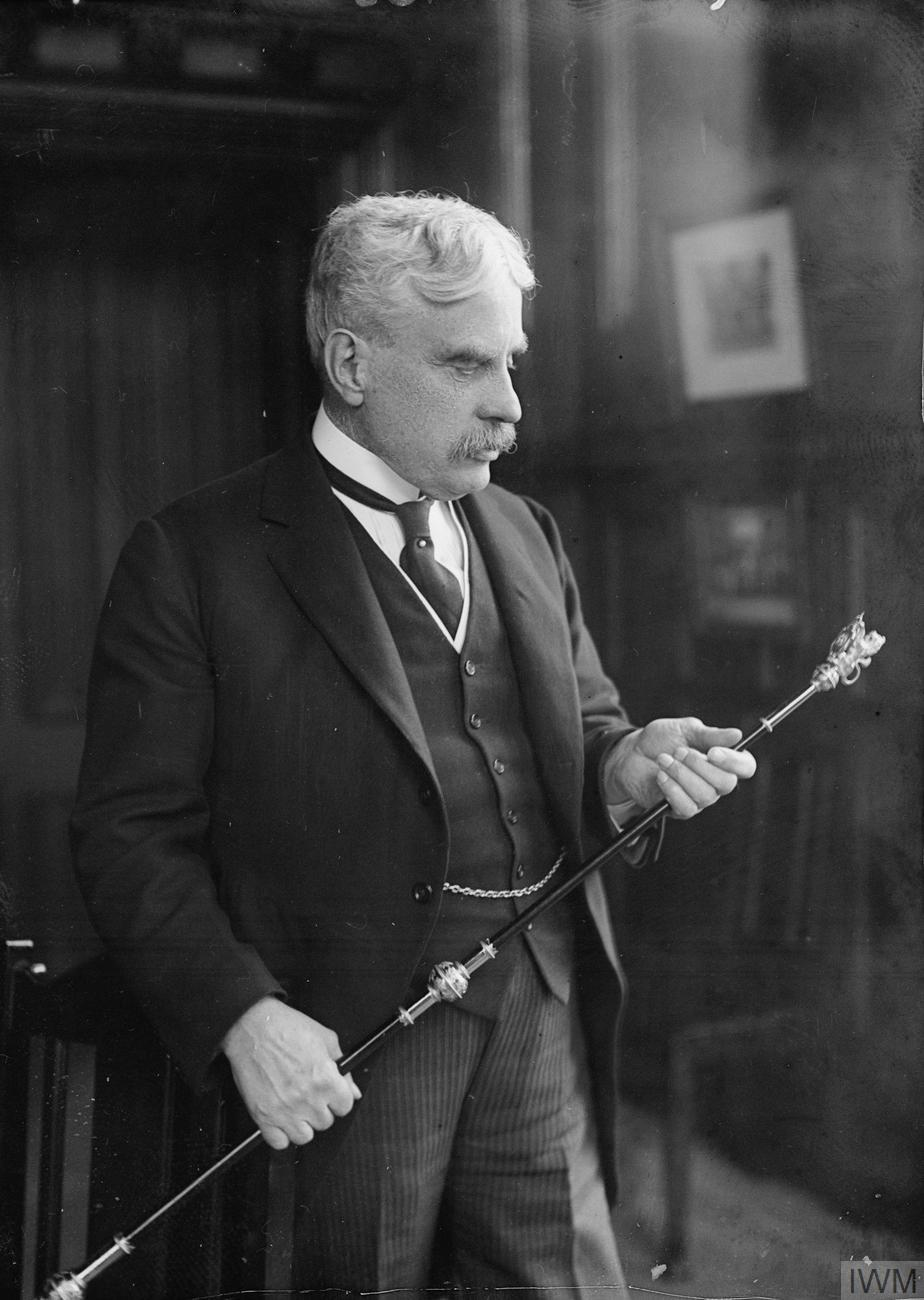
Robert Laird Borden inspecting the black rod of the Canadian Parliament, 1918

Monarchs often have a rod or sceptre signifying their office, and field-marshals are traditionally given a short thick baton in several countries. There are also offices which take their titles from their staff, such as Black Rod, the Tipstaff, Gold Stick and Silver Stick.

=== United Kingdom ===
==== White staves ====
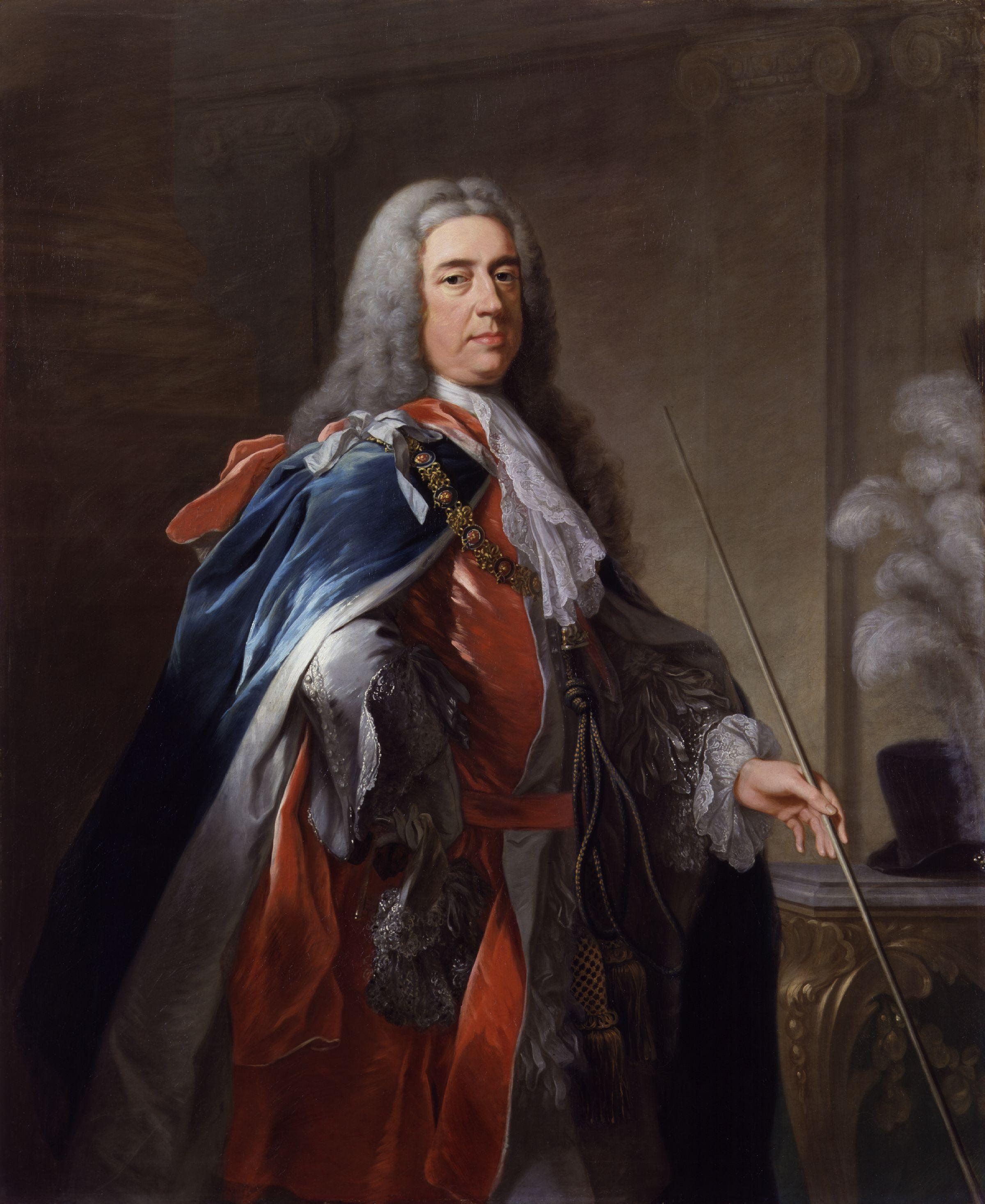
Charles FitzRoy, 2nd Duke of Grafton (d. 1757), carrying the thin white staff of the Lord Chamberlain

A thin white staff or "wand" is the traditional emblem of certain Great Officers of State and high-ranking officials of the Royal Household in the United Kingdom, namely:

Great Officers of State:

- The Lord High Treasurer
- The Lord High Steward
- The Lord Great Chamberlain

Senior Officers of the Household:

- The Lord Steward
- The Lord Chamberlain
- Treasurer of the Household
- Comptroller of the Household
- Vice-Chamberlain of the Household

The "wand", which is around 5 feet 6 inches (1.68 m) in length, is made of white wood and has a silver plate at its base on which is engraved the name of the office to which it pertains. The wands are carried by their holders when on duty on state or other royal occasions, such as state banquets, jubilee services and royal weddings, as well as at the State Opening of Parliament (when the Lord Great Chamberlain raises his white staff to signal to the king's messenger, Black Rod, to summon the Commons).

Apart from the Lord High Steward (an office which is only now filled for coronations), all the above-listed officials were seen carrying their white staves during a state funeral. The Lord Chamberlain, as executive head of the Royal Household, ceremonially broke his white staff at the state funeral of Queen Elizabeth II, when he automatically lost office; it was then buried with the sovereign. This was publicly observed at the committal service of Elizabeth II on 19 September 2022 (the first time such a service had been filmed or televised), when the incumbent, Lord Parker of Minsmere, performed this duty. The ritual, sometimes referred to as the "breaking of the stick", goes back many centuries (at one time all the officers of the Household who carried white staves would break them at this point and throw them into the grave, but since the 18th century the Lord Chamberlain alone has done so). The staff used to be physically broken, but in modern time it is jointed in the middle and the two halves can be separated.

The Lords with White Staves (namely the Lord Steward and Lord Chamberlain) are traditionally responsible for presenting addresses from the House of Lords to the Sovereign, and then delivering the Sovereign's response to the House. The Vice-Chamberlain of the Household today fulfils a similar role with regard to the House of Commons.

A queen consort traditionally has a separate Household, headed by her own Lord Chamberlain, who is likewise invested with a white staff. Following the funeral of Queen Elizabeth The Queen Mother in 2002, her Lord Chamberlain (the Earl of Crawford and Balcarres) attended the private interment service and likewise broke his white staff in two over her coffin.

==== Other state and ceremonial officers ====
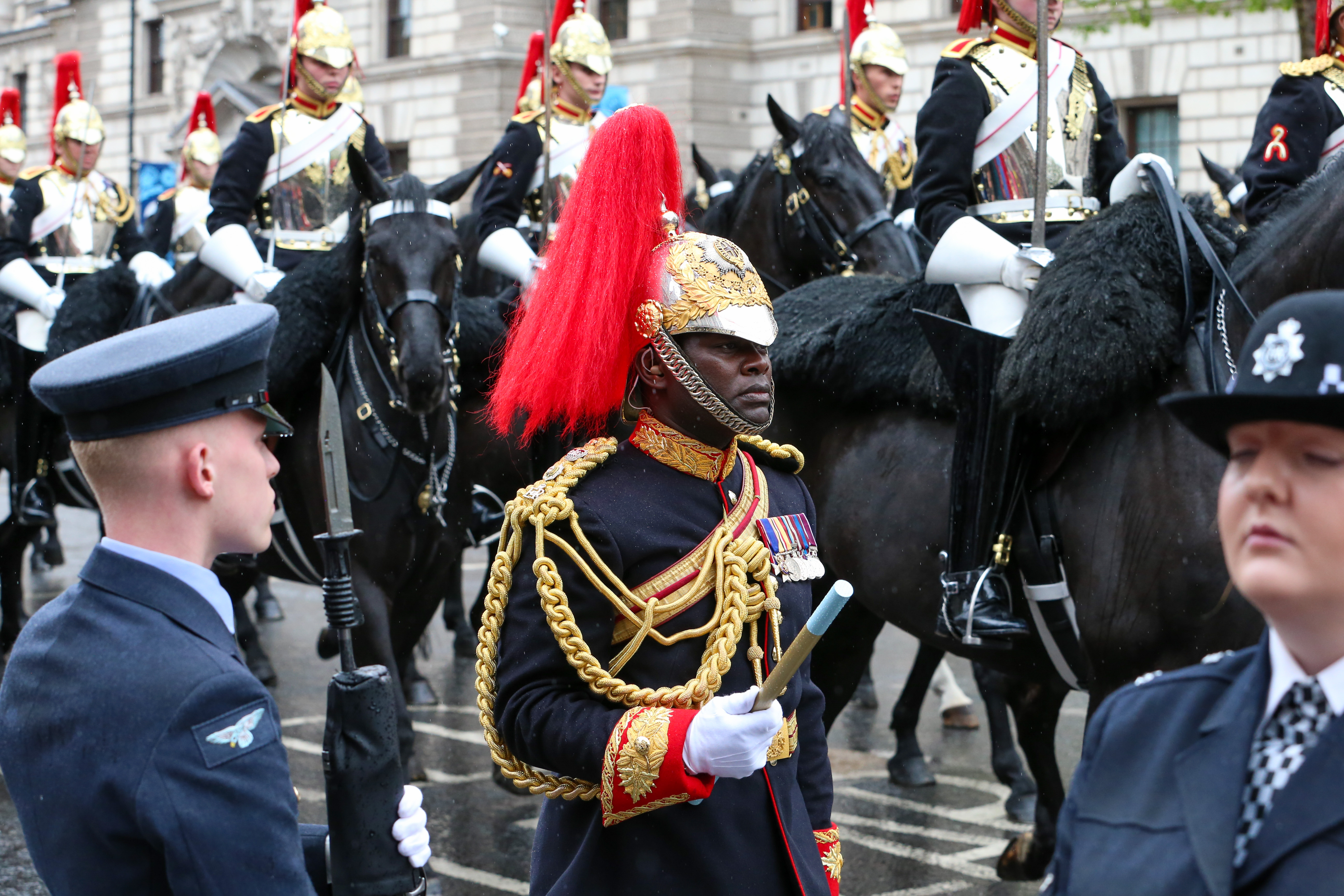
A Gold Staff Officer (Lt-Col. Nana Kofi Twumasi-Ankrah) marshalling the Coronation Procession in 2023.

The Earl Marshal and the Lord High Constable carry batons as their insignia when on duty, reflecting the military origins of those offices.

Garter King-of-Arms has carried a gold or silver rod on state occasions since 1522. In 1906 the other officers of arms were similarly each provided with a gold-mounted ebony baton, decorated with their individual badge of office; in 1953 these were replaced with white staves, topped with a blue dove within a gold coronet.

On great occasions of state the Earl Marshal may appoint officers to assist in the marshalling of processions and other duties; they are provided with a wooden staff of office as a symbol of their authority, the colour of which varies depending on the occasion: reflecting this, those on duty at Coronations are known as Gold Staff Officers, those on duty at State Funerals Purple Staff Officers, and in 1911 and 1969 those on duty at the Investiture of the Prince of Wales were termed Green Staff Officers.

=== Zimbabwe ===
In the precolonial Rozvi Empire, the mambo (king/emperor) gave his chiefs a staff each (tswimbe) as a symbol of office.

== See also ==
- Ceremonial weapon
- Ceremonial mace
- Wand of office
