= Baton (military) =

Military symbol

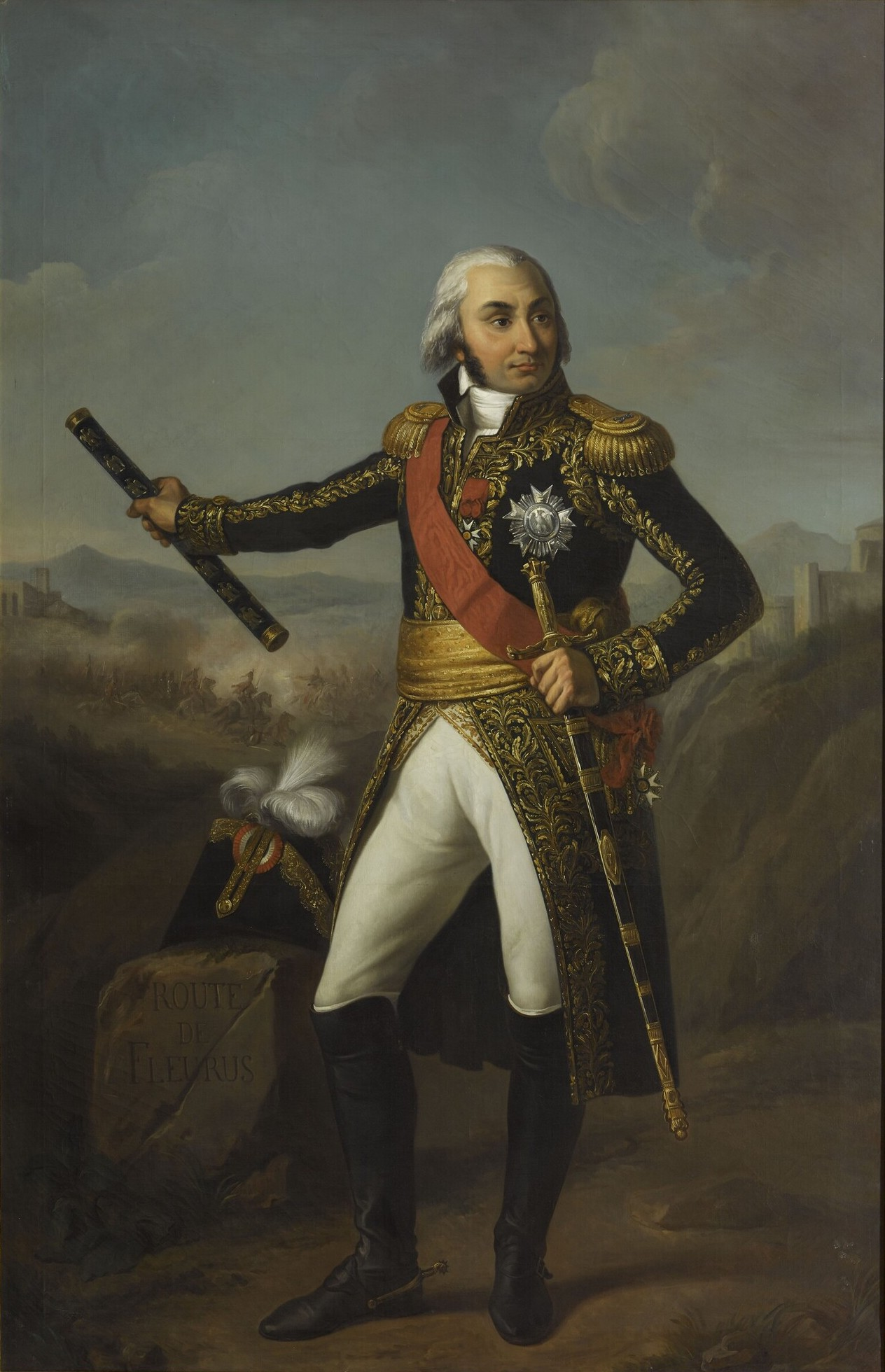
Jean-Baptiste Jourdan with his marshal's baton. In 1813, his baton was captured by British forces following the Battle of Vitoria.

The ceremonial baton is a short, thick stick-like object, typically in wood or metal, that is traditionally the sign of a field marshal or a similar high-ranking military officer, and carried as a piece of their uniform. The baton is distinguished from the swagger stick in being thicker and effectively without any practical function. A staff of office is rested on the ground; a baton is not. Unlike a royal sceptre that is crowned on one end with an eagle or globe, a baton is typically flat-ended.

== Origins ==
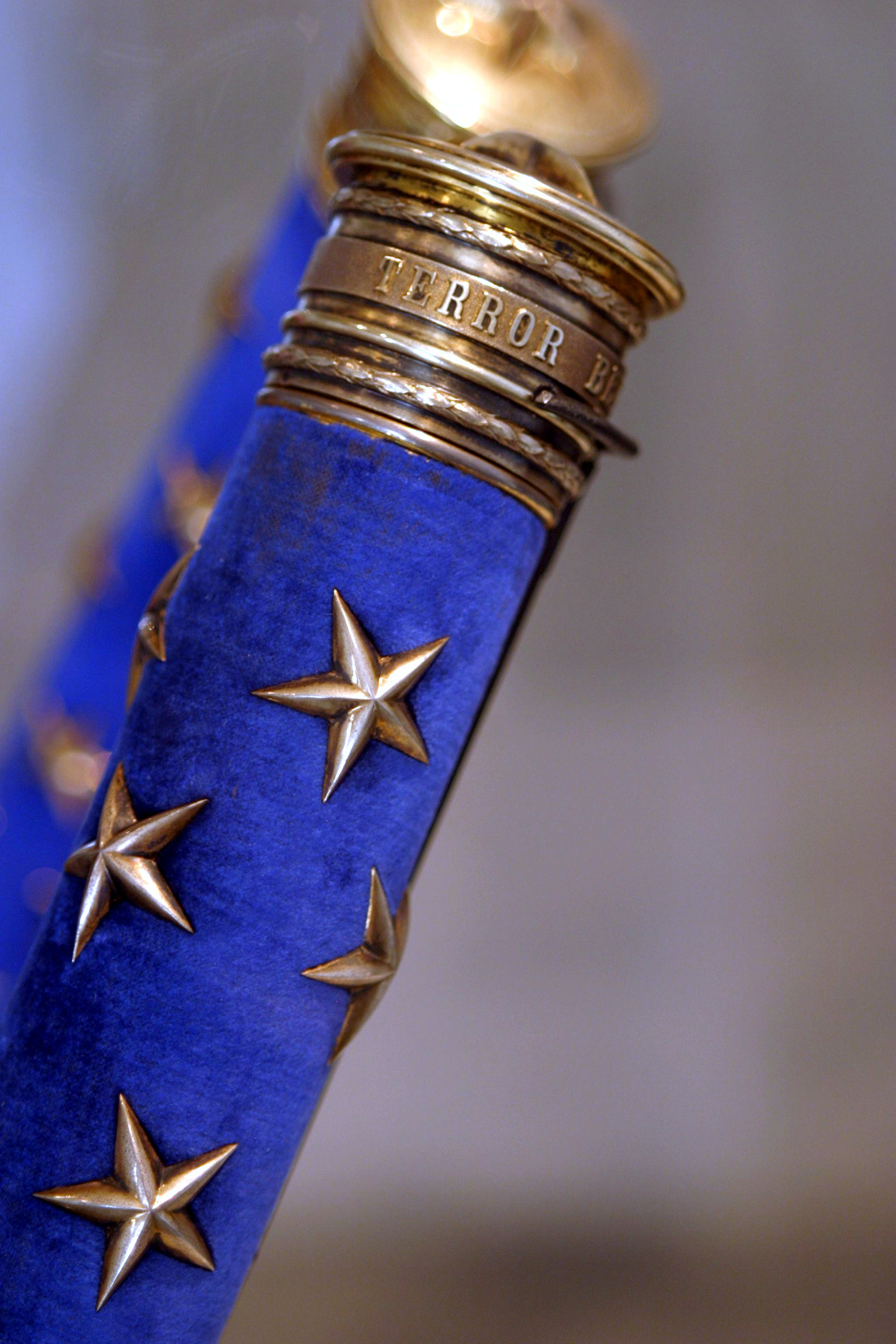
20th century French Marshal's baton

The baton can most likely be traced back to the mace, with ancient kings and pharaohs often being buried with ceremonial maces. With the advent of primitive body armor, the mace went out of fashion, but made a comeback as an effective weapon against full plate armour during the Late Middle Ages. During this time, the staff of office also became a prominent symbol of power.

By the time of Louis X of France, it was common for sergeants-at-arms to carry highly ornamented ceremonial maces. By the 16th century, the war mace had once again been phased out, solely replaced by an ornamented ceremonial version, used as a sign of wealth and power. As such, only army commanders would carry these devices, transforming the maces into symbols of power on the battlefield.

== Use ==
=== France ===
In France, the baton emerged as a sign of high command during the late Middle Ages. Marshals of France were among the most prominent holders of batons, but until the 18th century they were not the only ones. The model of the baton was not regulated until 1758, when a design based upon the traditional heraldic emblem of the marshals was introduced by Marshal de Belle-Île.

This design, a cylindric object made in wood and covered in blue velvet with gold ornaments, was retained in later regimes. The ornaments, however, changed: fleurs-de-lys during the Bourbon monarchy. Eagles were inserted for the Marshals of Napoleon Bonaparte, which he gave away batons in ceremonies as well as medals as propaganda means, and stars during the July Monarchy and Republican periods.

=== Germany ===
Coat of arms of Hermann Moritz, Count of Saxony with batons placed behind his arms as insignia

Imperial Generals (Reichsgeneräle), but especially Imperial Field Marshals (Reichsgeneralfeldmarschälle) of the Army of the Holy Roman Empire of the German Nation carried commando batons (Kommandostäbe) and later Marshal batons (Marschallstäbe). Also the supreme commander of the Imperial Army Generalissimus Albrecht von Wallenstein, but also Prince Eugene of Savoy carried such batons as symbols of their authority. The Field Marshals of other German states also received a Marschallstab, famous for this tradition was the German Kingdom of Prussia. As Arthur Wellesley, 1st Duke of Wellington, also a Generalfeldmarschall of the Prussian Army, died 1852, the Prussian king sent him a special baton (30 cm long) which was put in his coffin alongside his English Marshal baton. The batons of the Imperial German Army between 1871 and 1918 are particularly well-known.

==== 1935–1945 ====
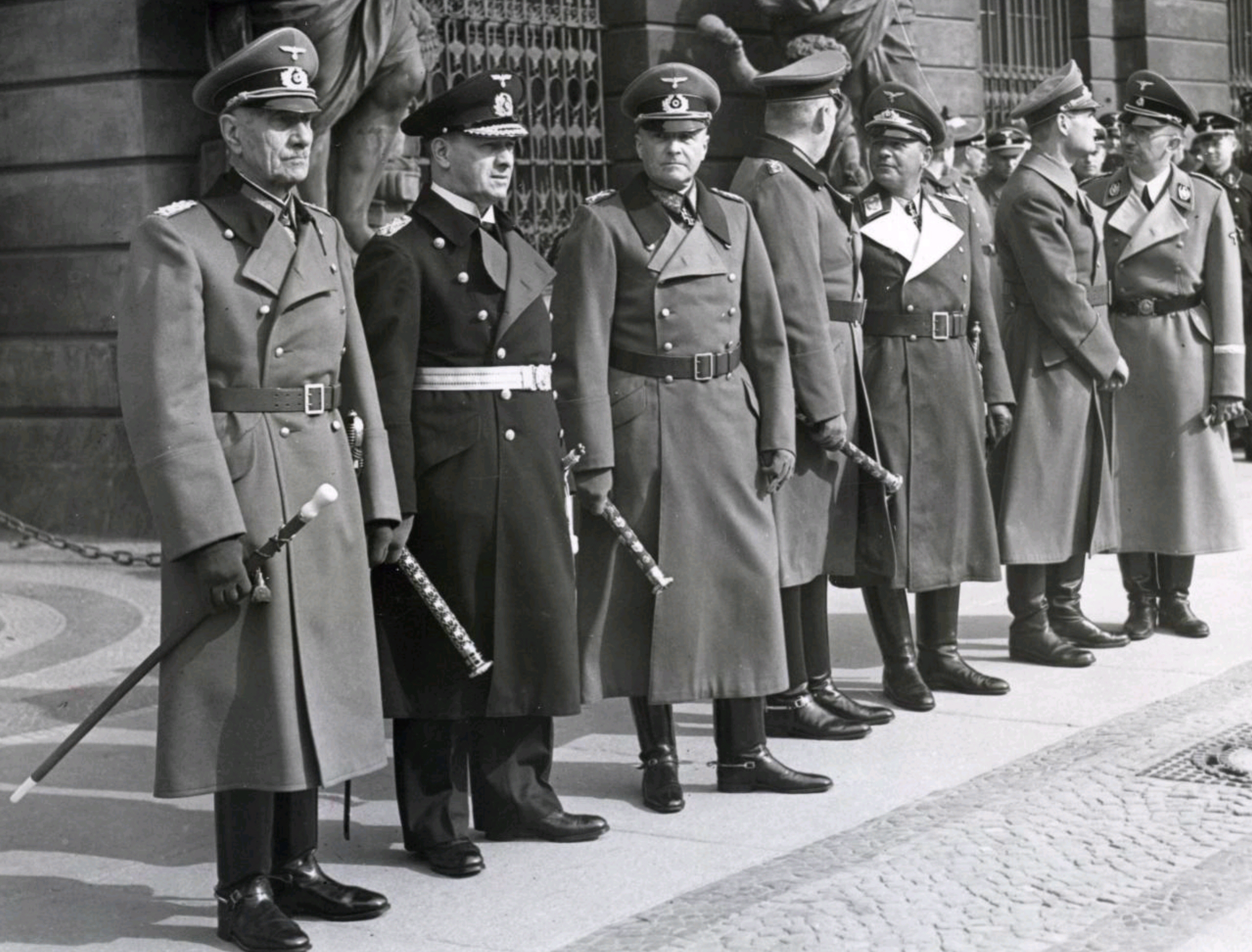
16 March 1941, Heldengedenktag. starting from left: four high-ranking German officers with their batons (left to right: Eduard von Böhm-Ermolli; Erich Raeder; Walther von Brauchitsch; Wilhelm Keitel).

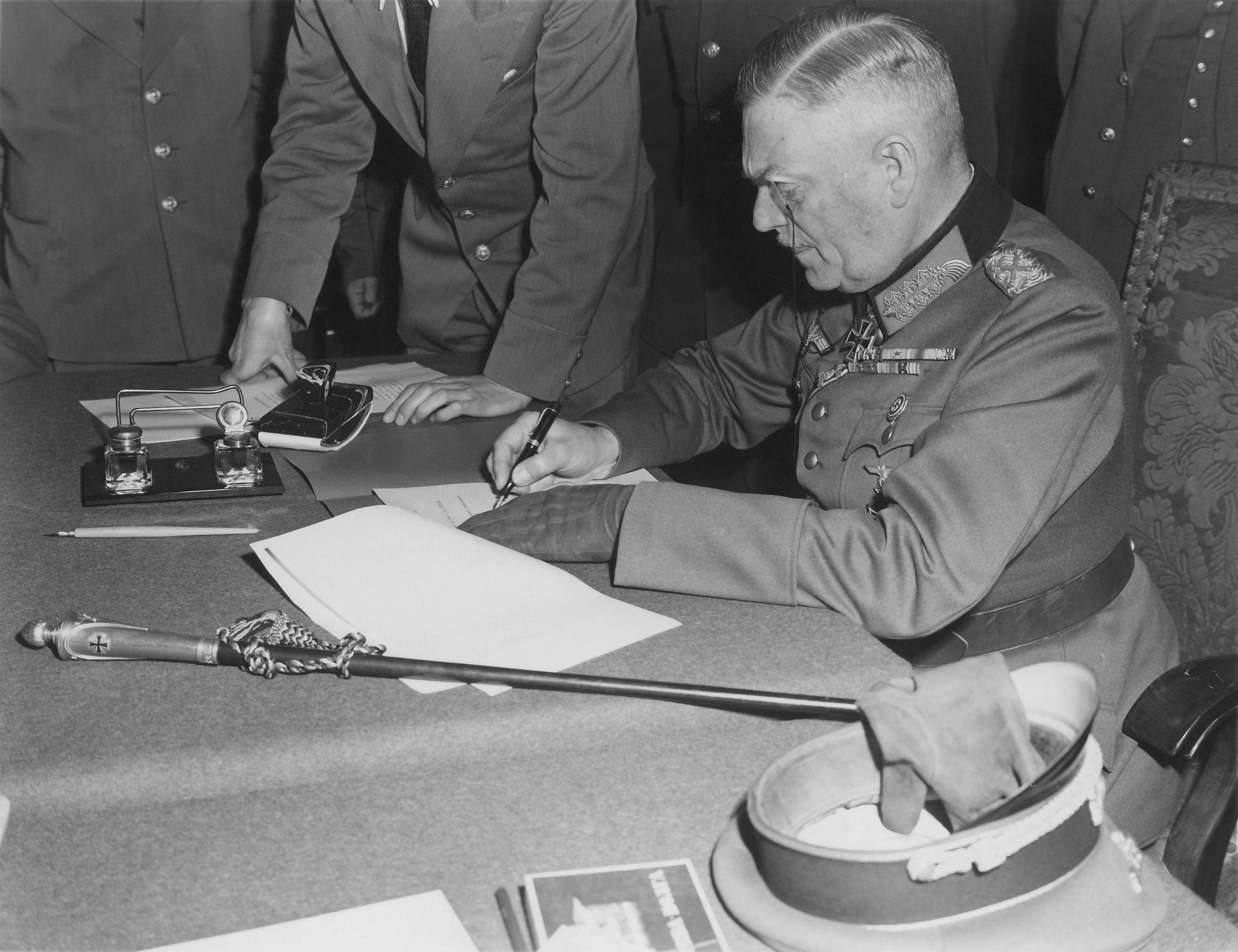
Field Marshal Keitel in May 1945 with his Interimsstab or field service baton.

In Nazi Germany, Generalfeldmarschalls and Großadmirals carried ceremonial batons, specially manufactured by German jewellers. Seven styles of batons were awarded to 25 individuals. Hermann Göring earned two different-style batons for his Generalfeldmarschall and Reichsmarschall promotions.

All the batons, except Erich Raeder's, were designed in a similar way: a shaft decorated with Iron Crosses and Wehrmacht eagles. Luftwaffe (air force) shafts showed the Balkenkreuz ("beam cross"), whereas Kriegsmarine (navy) shafts had fouled anchors. The ends of the batons were decorated with ornate caps.

The seven styles of Nazi-era batons

1. The first baton awarded was to Field Marshal Werner von Blomberg. This baton's shaft had a light blue velvet covering material. It is now in the National Museum of American History in Washington, DC.
2. The first air force baton awarded was to Hermann Göring after his promotion to field marshal. Though it was designed similarly to the Blomberg baton with a light blue velvet shaft covering, it incorporated the air force Balkenkreuz symbols. Additionally, the end caps were inlaid with many small diamonds. It is now kept in the National Infantry Museum at Fort Moore, Georgia.
3. The next baton awarded was to Grand Admiral Erich Raeder. This baton's shaft had a dark blue velvet covering. This baton differed from other batons by having a chain link pattern sewn over the crosses, eagles and anchors. At the end of the war, the baton was reportedly disassembled and sold in pieces.
4. Nine army batons were awarded in the summer of 1940 to newly promoted field marshals. The batons' shafts had red velvet coverings and differed only in identifying inscriptions on the end caps. Eight more batons of this style were later awarded to other field marshals upon their promotions. The first group was manufactured for 6,000 RM (about US$30,000 in 2012) each. Most of the batons are now in museums or private collections.
5. Three air force batons were awarded in the summer of 1940. They had blue velvet covering and the Balkenkreuz design, differing only in individual end cap inscriptions. One more baton of this style was awarded in 1943. The 1940 air force batons were slightly more expensive to manufacture than the 1940 army batons.
6. The only other navy baton was awarded to Grand Admiral Karl Dönitz. It had a blue velvet shaft covering and incorporated a U-boat symbol on one of the end caps. It is now in the Shropshire Regimental Museum, Shrewsbury, UK, and was donated by Major General J. B. Churcher, who captured Dönitz at war's end and took the baton.
7. The only Reichsmarschall baton was presented to Hermann Göring in 1940. While similar looking to the other 1940 batons, it incorporated exceptional materials. The shaft was white elephant ivory, not velvet-covered metal. The end caps incorporated platinum in the inscription banding and over 600 small diamonds. The baton was manufactured for 22,750 RM (about US$130,000 in 2012). It is now in the U.S. Army's West Point Museum, Highland Falls, New York.

German field service batons

German field marshals often carried an Interimsstab while on active service, a lighter and thinner baton resembling a swagger stick.

=== Russia ===
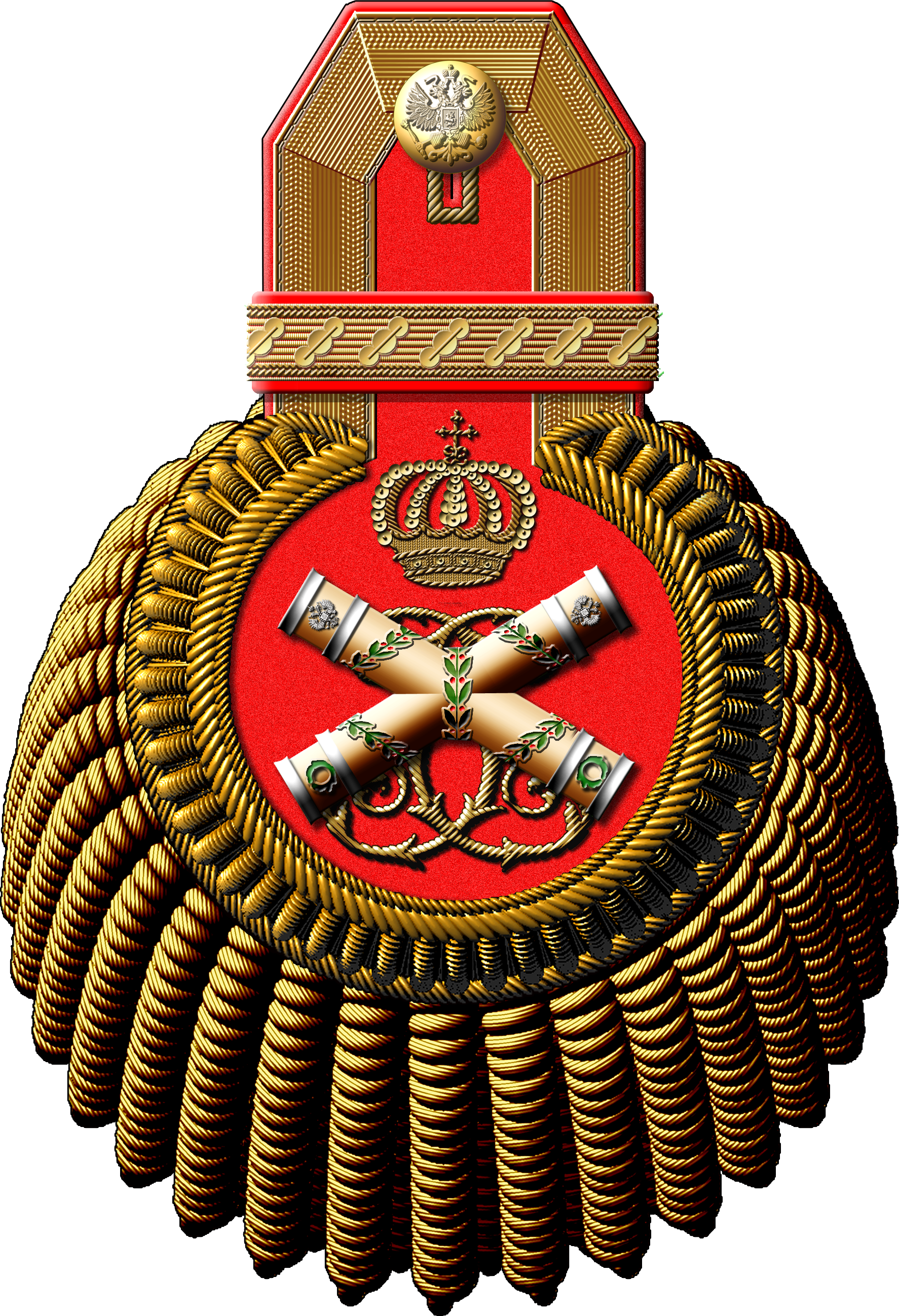
An epaulette of a general-field marshal of the Russian Empire, c. 1912.

The first [Russian] Field Marshal's baton, the emblem of this high military rank, was given to Count Fedor Golovin in 1700. In the 19th century, during the reign of Alexander I of Russia (1801-1825), only four Russian Generals and the Duke of Wellington received the coveted baton. Six were awarded during the reign of Nicholas I of Russia (1825-1855), and a further six were issued under Alexander II of Russia (1855-1881). No Field Marshals were appointed during the reign of Alexander III of Russia (1881-1894) and only four batons were awarded during the reign of Nicholas II of Russia (1894-1917), the last being to His Royal Highness King Carol I of Romania in 1912.

— Staff at Christie's 2004

The Soviet Union and the Russian Federation use a "Marshal's star" (a diamond-encrusted star worn around the neck) to denote marshal rank.

=== United Kingdom ===
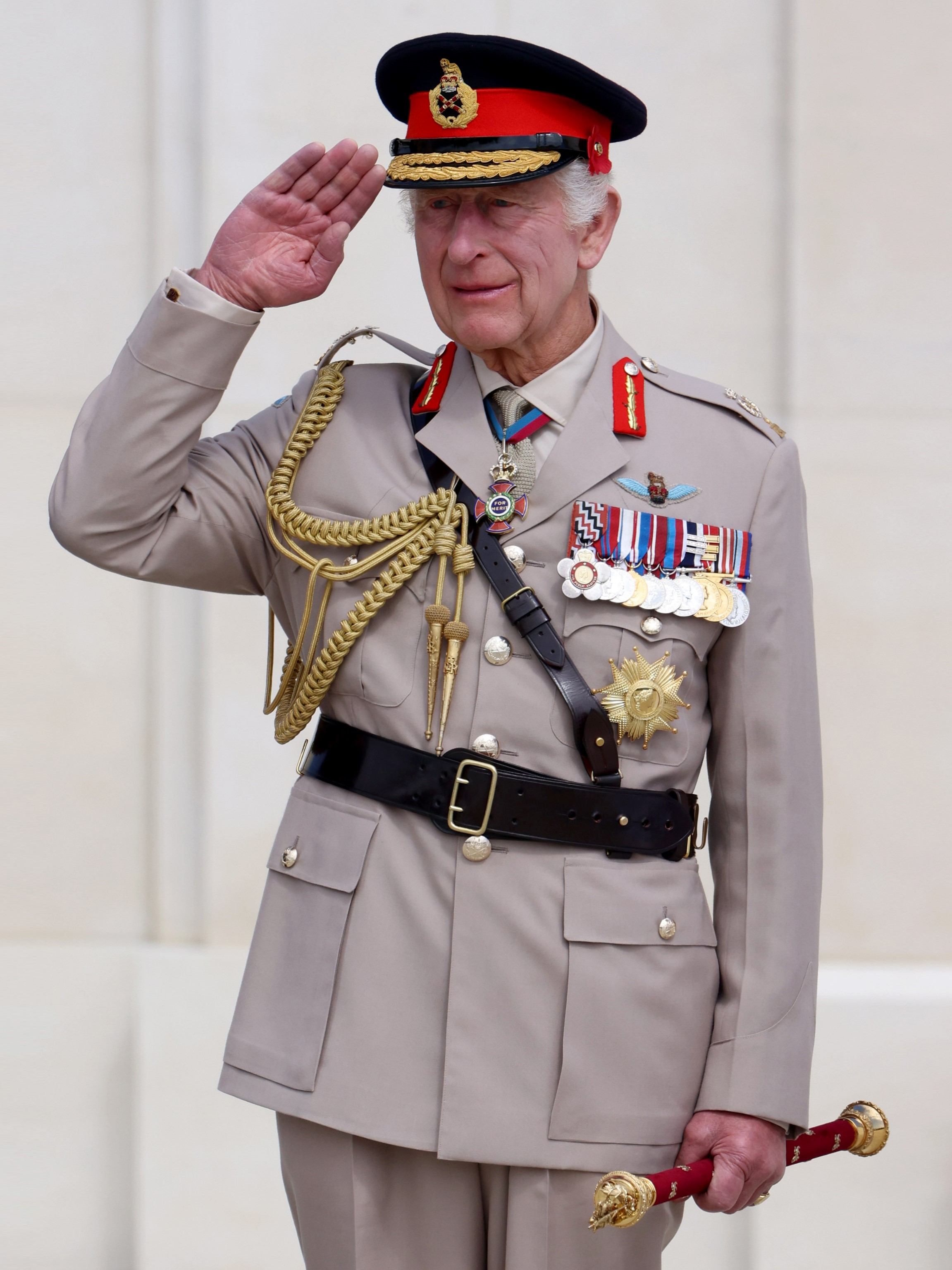
Charles III saluting while holding a baton.

On appointment, British field marshals are awarded a baton covered in crimson velvet, and decorated with gold lions passant regardant. The gold top bears a representation of Saint George and the Dragon.

The Duke of Wellington possessed multiple batons, since he held the rank of field marshal or equivalent in eight European armies each of which presented him with a baton. In addition to his English baton he was presented with two British batons. Nine of the batons (along with some staffs of office) are displayed at his former home, Apsley House (the Russian baton was stolen on 9 December 1965 and has not been recovered).

=== Thailand ===
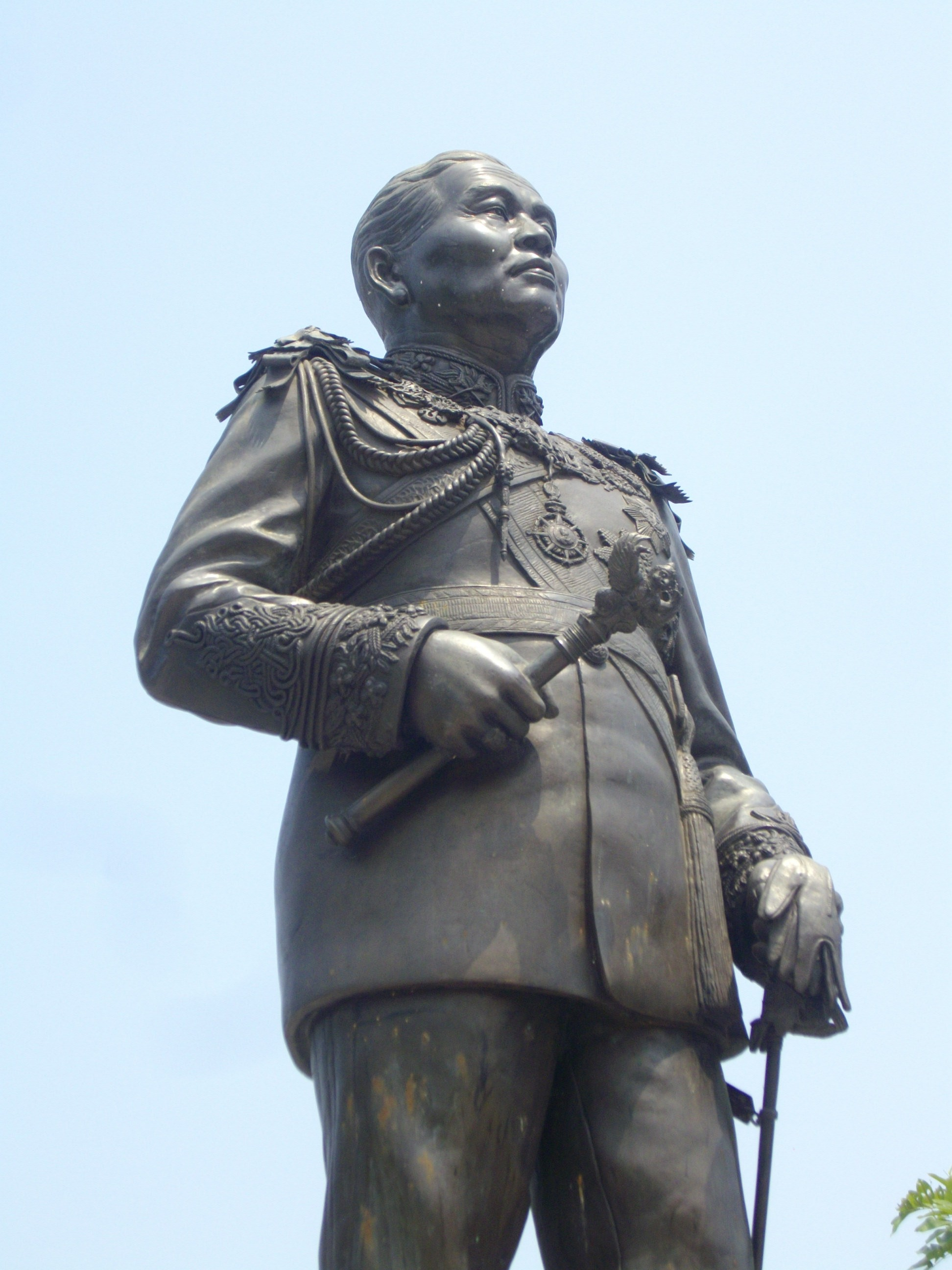
Monument to Sarit Thanarat, 11th Prime minister of Thailand, holding his Field Marshal's Baton.

The position of Field Marshal is symbolized by a baton. It is made of metal and topped by a depiction of the Garuda, which is the national symbol of Thailand and the emblem of the King of Thailand, who is Commander in Chief of the Thai Armed Forces.

== In heraldry and culture ==
A baton appears occasionally in heraldry as an armorial achievement by field marshals upon achieving substantive or honorary rank. In England and Wales, batons are usually represented as behind the coat of arms crossed in saltire although the sole holder of this achievement in practice is the Duke of Norfolk in his capacity as Earl Marshal.

== See also ==
- Bulawa
- Ceremonial weapon
- Gunbai
- Marshal's star
- Saihai
- Swagger stick
- Vine staff
