= Pace stick =

Military drill aid

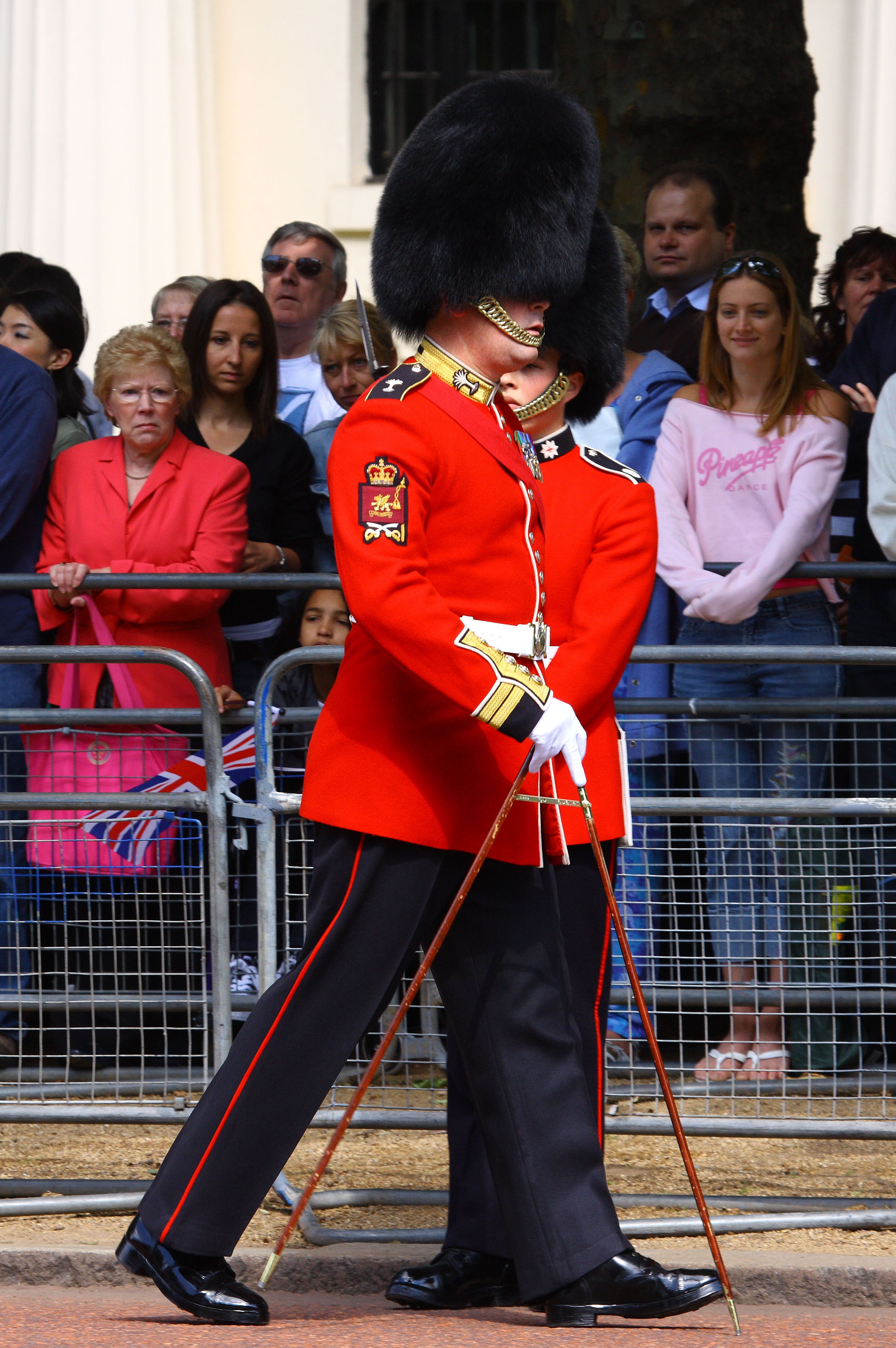
A warrant officer of the Welsh Guards using his pace stick.

A pace stick is a long stick usually carried by warrant officer and non-commissioned officer drill instructors in the British and Commonwealth armed forces as an aid to military drill.

A pace stick usually consists of two pieces of wood, hinged at the top, and tapering towards the bottom, very similar to large wooden drafting compasses used on school blackboards. They are usually shod and fitted with highly polished brass. They can open so that the tips separate at fixed distances, corresponding to various lengths of marching pace, such as "double march", "quick march", "step short", etc. When opened to the correct pace length, the pace stick can be held alongside the holder's body by the hinge, with one leg of the stick vertical to the ground, and the other leg pointing forward. By twirling the stick while marching, the stick can be made to "walk" alongside its holder at the proper pace.

Otherwise, while on parade or when marching, it is normally carried tucked tightly under the left arm and parallel to the ground, with the left hand grasping the stick near the top.

== Use in the Commonwealth ==
Several militaries and police services in the Commonwealth of Nations use a pace stick.

=== United Kingdom ===
The pace stick is usually permitted to be carried off the parade ground by the regimental sergeant major alone; however, at a particular regiment's discretion, other sergeants and sergeants-major or equivalent may carry a pace stick if they are qualified drill instructors.

The origin of the pace stick is claimed by the Royal Regiment of Artillery, who used a "gunner's stick" to measure the distance between guns in the field. It appeared more like a walking stick, with an ivory or silver knob on the end, and, unlike the modern pace stick, could only be opened a fixed distance. It was quickly adopted and adapted by the Infantry as an aid to drill.

Another stick carried by soldiers is the drill cane, regimental stick or swagger stick. This is a shorter cane, with polished metal ends. Sometimes these sticks are ornamented by a mock bullet casing, half at each end of the stick; these ornaments are often chromed, or left in their natural brass, but highly polished. They are carried on parade solely as an indicator of rank and authority by senior non-commissioned officers and warrant officers, and their use is generally governed (or restricted altogether) by the regimental sergeant major.

Pace sticks can be opened to specific distances, which each measure specific things:

| Inches | Centimetres | Significance |
|---|---|---|
| 12 | 30 | Distance between heels when at ease, and regulation side pace |
| 21 | 53 | Distance between ranks when stood in closed order |
| 24 | 61 | Distance between files, also width of one 'man' when leaving a blank file |
| 27 | 69 | Stepping short, inside rank when wheeling |
| 30 | 76 | Regulation pace for quick and slow march |
| 33 | 84 | Stepping out, outside rank when wheeling |
| 40 | 100 | Regulation pace for double march |

=== Other countries ===
A warrant officer of the Royal 22nd Regiment with a drill stick at the Citadelle of Quebec

Drill canes and pace sticks are used by non-commissioned members (non-commissioned officers) of the Canadian Army, and cadets at the Royal Military College of Canada to gauge the length of pace and measure distance and intervals. They are not customarily carried by personnel of the Royal Canadian Navy and the Royal Canadian Air Force. Pace sticks are also used by some police services in Canada, including the Royal Canadian Mounted Police (RCMP).

Pace sticks have also found use with Australian police forces, including the college sergeant and drill instructors of the Australian Federal Police, the drill sergeant of the Victoria Police Academy and the academy senior protocol officer of the New South Wales Police Academy, holding the rank of senior sergeant and hence the highest senior non-commissioned officer carries the pace stick as a badge of office.

== Denmark ==
In 2017, along with other changes made to the Royal Danish Army, the stick was reintroduced for those of sergeant major rank for parades and other appropriate occasions.

== See also ==
- Caliper
- Swagger stick
- Vine staff
