= Field marshal =

Most senior military rank

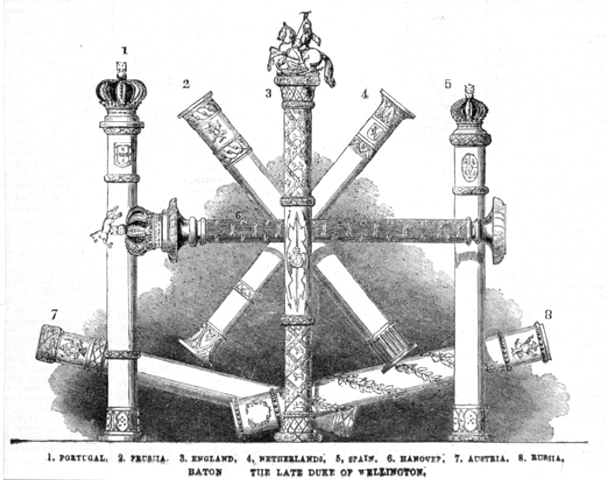
The ceremonial marshal's batons of the Duke of Wellington

Field marshal (or field-marshal, abbreviated as FM) is the most senior military rank, senior to the general officer ranks.

Promotion to the rank of field marshal in many countries historically required extraordinary military achievement by a general (a wartime victory). However, the rank has also been used as a divisional command rank and as a brigade command rank.

Historically, in some countries the rank of generalissimo was regarded as a rank superior to field marshal, but has mostly fallen out of use and no currently living holders exist.

== Origins ==
The origin of the term dates to the early Middle Ages, originally meaning the keeper of the king's horses (from Old German Marh-scalc, lit. 'horse-servant'), from the time of the early Frankish kings; words originally meaning "servant" were sometimes used to mean "subordinate official" or similar. The German Holy Roman Empire and the kingdom of France had officers named Feldmarschall and Maréchal de camp respectively as far back as the 1600s. The exact wording of the titles used by field marshals varies: examples include "marshal" and "field marshal general".

The air force equivalent in Commonwealth and many Middle Eastern air forces is marshal of the air force (not to be confused with air marshal). Navies, which usually do not use the nomenclature employed by armies or air forces, use titles such as "fleet admiral," "grand admiral" or "admiral of the fleet" for the equivalent rank. The traditional attribute distinguishing a field marshal is a baton. The baton nowadays is purely ornamental, and as such may be richly decorated. That said, it is not necessary for the insignia to be a baton (Such is the case in Russia post-1991 and the former Soviet Union, which use a jewelled star referred to as a Marshal's star).

== Field marshal ranks by country ==
=== Australia ===
The first appointment to the rank was Sir William Birdwood, who received the honour in March 1925. Sir Thomas Blamey was the second appointment to the rank, and was the first and so far only Australian-born and Australian Army substantive (not honorary) field marshal. He was promoted to the rank on the insistence of Sir Robert Menzies, the Prime Minister of Australia, in June 1950. His field marshal's baton is on display in the Second World War galleries at the Australian War Memorial in Canberra. The third appointment was Prince Philip, Duke of Edinburgh, who was promoted to the rank on 1 April 1954. The fourth and latest appointment was to King Charles III in October 2024.

=== Austrian Empire and Austria-Hungary ===
Feldmarschall of the k.u.k. Army

The rank existed in the Austrian Empire as Kaiserlicher Feldmarschall ("Imperial field marshal") and in Austria-Hungary as Kaiserlicher und königlicher Feldmarschall (Hungarian: Császári és királyi tábornagy; transl. Imperial and royal field marshal. Both were based on prior usage during the Holy Roman Empire. The Emperor-King held the rank ex officio, other officers were promoted as required. Between 1914 and 1918, ten men attained this rank, of whom four were members of the reigning Habsburg-Lorraine dynasty.

=== Denmark ===
Field Marshal was the second highest rank in the Royal Danish Army below General field marshal, both ranks were abolished in 1842.

=== Ethiopia ===
On 8 January 2022, General Birhanu Jula, the Chief of General Staff of the Ethiopian National Defence Force, was promoted to the rank of Field Marshal (or Field Marshal General, depending on source). The rank was introduced to the Ethiopian National Defence Force with this promotion. The rank of Field Marshal was last used in Ethiopia during the Ethiopian Empire in the 20th century, when Emperor Haile Selassie was head of the Imperial Ethiopian Army. The formal ceremonial uniform matched that of its British counterpart, with the exception of headgear, which was a Bicorne adorned with a golden lion's mane.

=== Finland ===
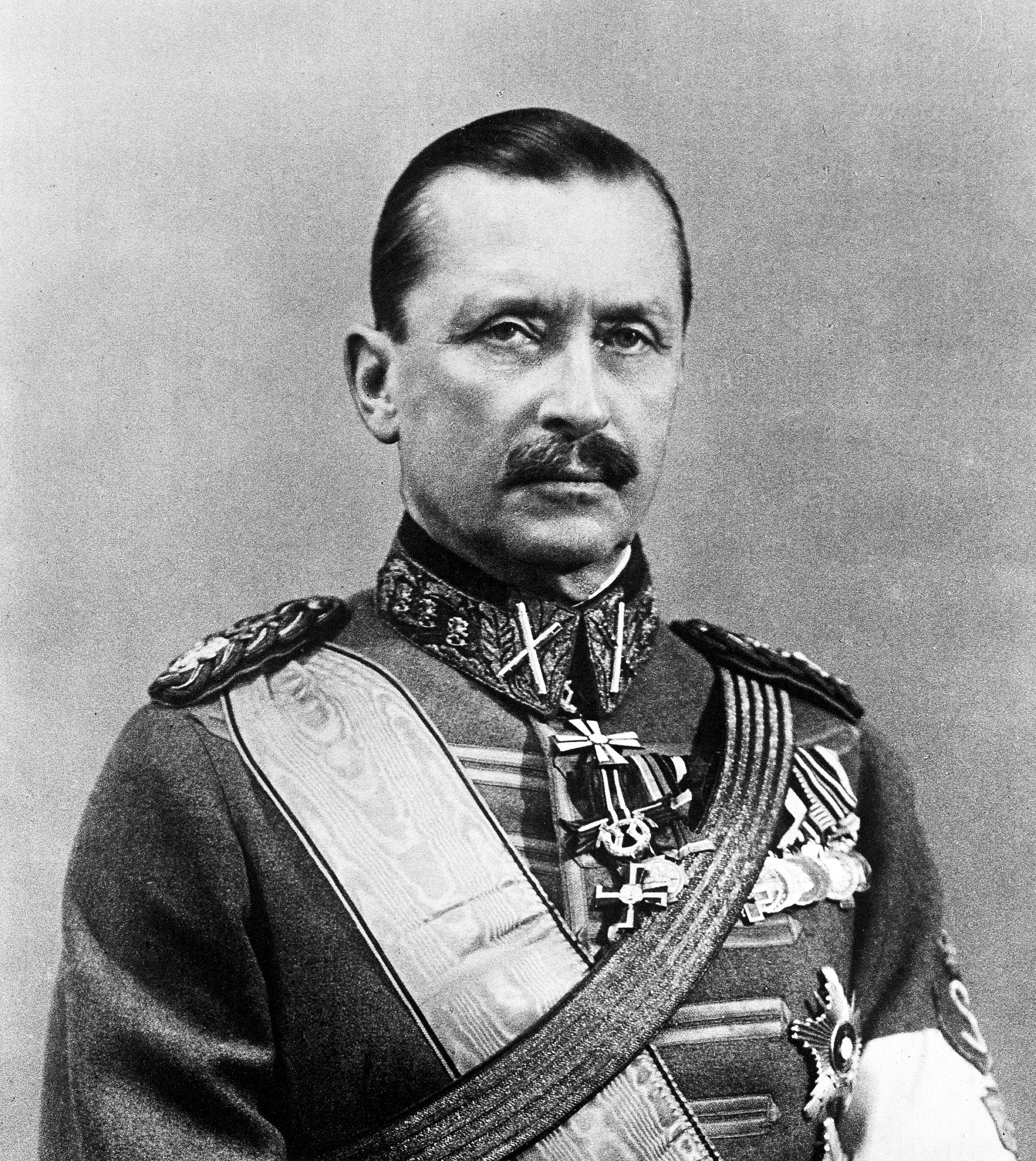
C. G. E. Mannerheim

Carl Gustaf Emil Mannerheim was promoted to Field Marshal in 1933. In 1942 he was promoted to Marshal of Finland, which is not a distinctive military rank but an honour.

=== German-speaking lands ===
Generalfeldmarschall ('general field marshal or field marshal general) was the most senior general officer rank in the armies of several German states, including Saxony, Brandenburg-Prussia, Prussia, the German Empire, and lastly, Germany (from 1918). The rank was also given to imperial generals in southern German States including Austria (Reichsgeneralfeldmarschall) by the Roman-German Emperor during the existence of the Holy Roman Empire up to 1806.

=== India ===
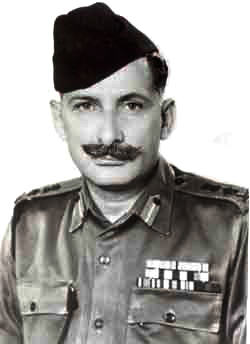
Field Marshal Sam Manekshaw

Field marshal is the highest attainable rank in the Indian Army. It is a ceremonial/war time rank. There have been two Indian field marshals to date. Sam Manekshaw was promoted to the rank in 1973 for his role in leading the Indian Army to aid in the final days of the Indian Army's support for the Bangladesh Liberation War against Pakistan. K. M. Cariappa was promoted in 1986, long after he retired, in recognition of his services for beating back the Pakistani invasion of Kashmir in 1947–48 in his role as Army Commander of India's Western Command, and for later as the first Indian Commander-in-Chief of the Indian Army.

=== Malaysia ===
Field Marshal is the highest rank in the Malaysian Army and are reserved for His Majesty the King of Malaysia though there are several non-royals who hold this rank.

=== New Zealand ===
Charles, Prince of Wales, as he was at the time, was officially appointed a Field Marshal in the New Zealand Army in November 2015. As King Charles III, he remains the only living person to hold the ranks of Field Marshal in the New Zealand Army, Admiral of the Fleet in the Royal New Zealand Navy (RNZN) and Marshal of the RNZAF. The King's late father, the Duke of Edinburgh (1921–2021), also held these three ranks during his lifetime.

=== Pakistan ===
In 1959, Ayub Khan was promoted to the rank of Field marshal. He was the first Field Marshal in the history of Pakistan. He also served as the second President of Pakistan and was the first native Commander-in-Chief of the Pakistan Army.

On 12 May 1963, the King of Nepal, Mahendra Bir Bikram Shah, was honored with the rank of Field Marshal of Pakistan Army as an honorary conferment by the President of Pakistan, Field Marshal Ayub Khan.

On 20 May 2025, General Asim Munir became the third officer to be promoted to the rank of Field Marshal following his command in the brief conflict with India.

=== Philippines ===
US Army General Douglas MacArthur was the first and only field marshal in the history of the Philippine Army, a position he held while also acting as the Military Advisor to the Commonwealth Government of the Philippines with a rank of major general. President Quezon conferred the rank of field marshal on 24 August 1936 and MacArthur's duty included the supervision of the creation of the Philippines nation-state.

=== Russia and the Soviet Union ===
Imperial Russia had for a long time maintained the rank of Field Marshal. It was active all the way until the Russian Revolutions of 1917. When the Bolsheviks took over, they briefly abandoned military ranks until 1935. When it was restored, an equivalent rank Marshal of the Soviet Union was introduced in place of the Imperial Russian Army Field Marshal. Following the dissolution of the Soviet Union, the rank was replaced by the Marshal of the Russian Federation. However, as of 2025, there has only been one Marshal of the Russian Federation.

=== South Africa ===
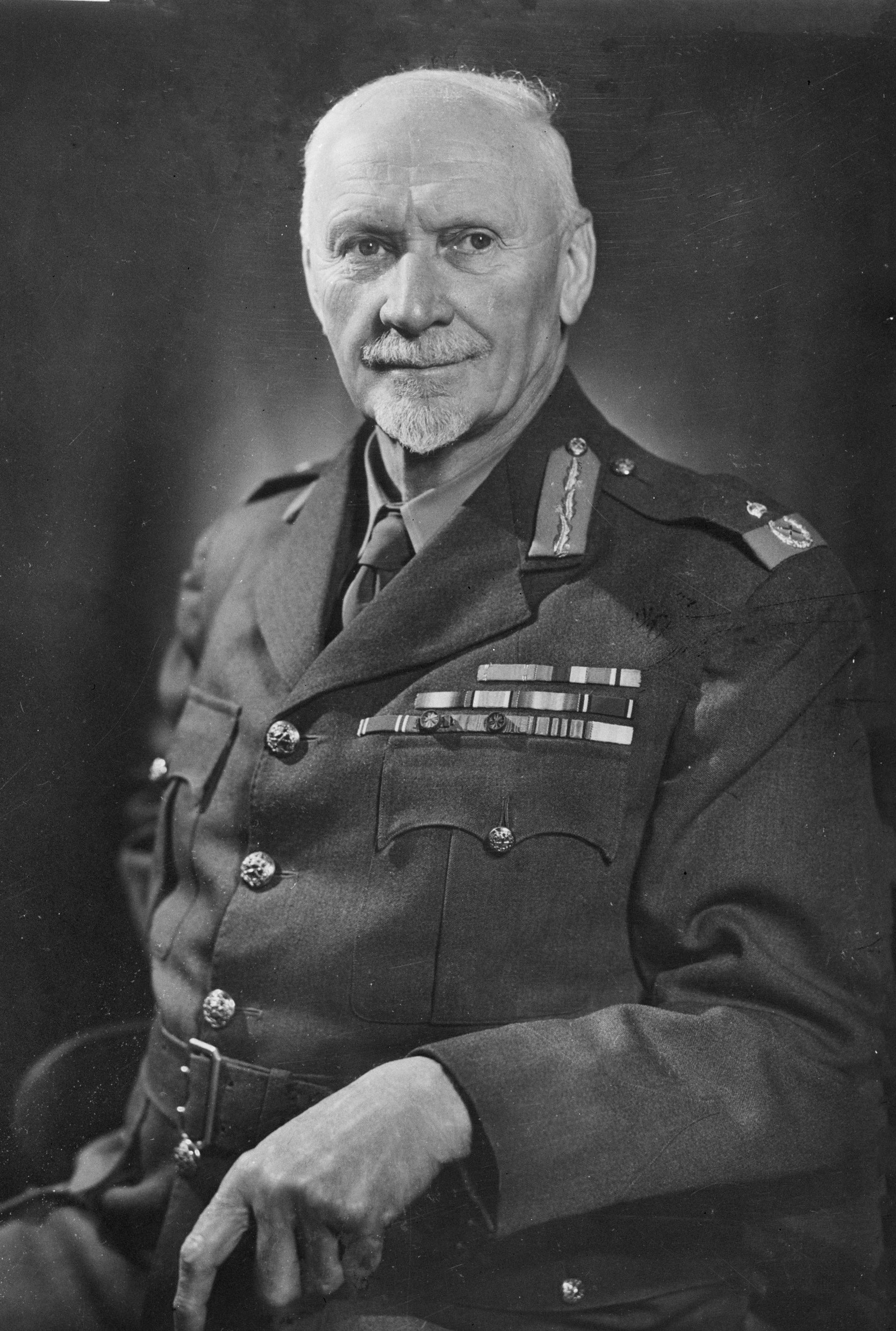
Jan Smuts

South African statesman and prime minister Jan Smuts was appointed a field marshal of the British Army on 24 May 1941.

=== Sri Lanka ===
Field Marshal is the highest rank in the Sri Lanka Army. It is a ceremonial rank. Sarath Fonseka is the first and only Sri Lankan officer to hold the rank. He was promoted to the position on 22 March 2015.

=== Sweden ===
In Sweden, a total of 75 field marshals have been appointed, from 1609 to 1824. Since 1972, the rank has not been used in Sweden, and it had long been decided to only be used in wartime.

The title denoted the commander of the mounted part of the army. During the Thirty Years' War, the field marshal was subordinate to the country's lieutenant general. In the Swedish army, the field marshal had unlimited military and considerable political authority. However, the field marshal was subordinate to the Lord High Constable of Sweden (Riksmarsken) and his closest man was Svensk uppslagsbok.

Initially, the field marshal was the commander of the cavalry and first became the foremost military rank in Sweden during the early 17th century, especially after count Jakob Pontusson de la Gardie received the rank.

=== Uganda ===
Field Marshal Idi Amin was the military dictator and third president of Uganda from 1971 to 1979. Amin joined the British colonial regiment, the King's African Rifles in 1946, serving in Somalia and Kenya. Eventually, Amin held the rank of major general in the post-colonial Ugandan Army and became its commander before seizing power in the military coup of January 1971, deposing Milton Obote. He later promoted himself to field marshal while he was the head of state.

=== United Kingdom ===
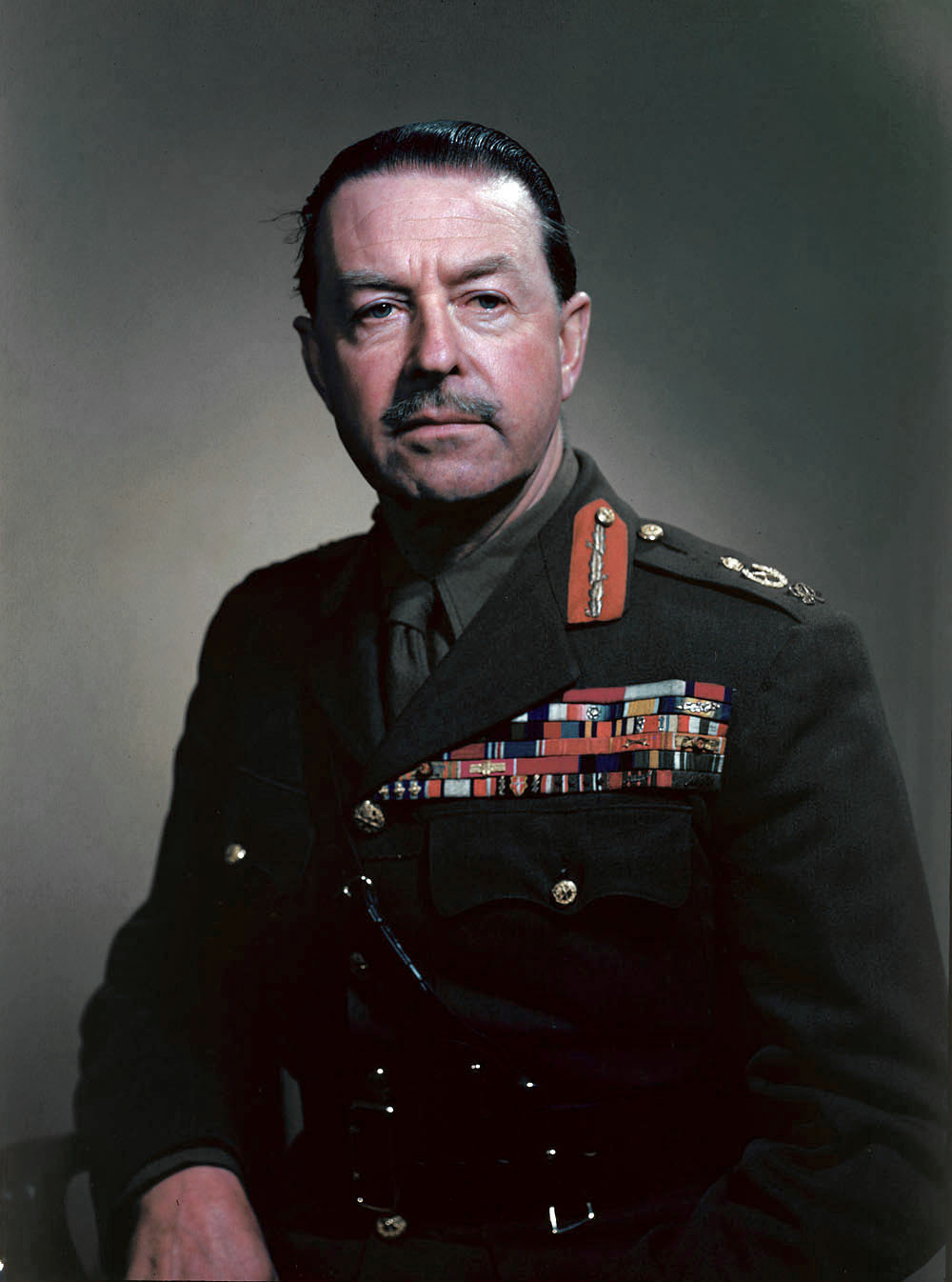
General Sir Harold Alexander was promoted to field marshal in the British Army when he was made Supreme Allied Commander Mediterranean during World War II

Arthur Wellesley, 1st Duke of Wellington, was promoted to the rank of a field marshal (of multiple armies) in 1813. Nine of his field marshal batons are on display in Apsley House (see Batons of Arthur Wellesley, 1st Duke of Wellington).

=== United States ===
No branch of the United States Armed Forces has ever used the rank of field marshal. On 14 December 1944, Congress created the rank of "general of the army", a five-star rank equivalent to that of field marshal in other countries. Two days later, George Marshall was promoted to this rank, becoming the first five-star general in American history. It has been suggested that the denomination of "Marshal" for a five-star officer was not adopted because, otherwise, George Marshall would be addressed as "Marshal Marshall", which was considered undignified. Thus, Douglas MacArthur is the only US officer ever to have received the rank of Marshal, which was given to him by the government of the Philippines.

== Insignia ==
(Australian Army)

Fil marsyal
(Royal Brunei Land Force)

Amharic: የፊልድ ማርሻል ጄኔራል, romanized: Yefīlidi marishali jēnērali
(Ethiopian Army)

(Ghana Army)

Hindi: फ़ील्ड मार्शल, romanized: pheeld maarshal
(Indian Army)

Fil marsyal
(Malaysian Army)

(New Zealand Army)

(Nigerian Army)

Urdu: فیلڈ مارشل, romanized: field marchell
(Pakistan Army)

(Sri Lanka Army)

(British Army)

== See also ==
- Admiralissimo
- Generalissimo
- Generalfeldmarschall
- Marshal
- Grand Marshal
- Grand Admiral
- Admiral of the Fleet
- List of Field Marshals
