= Wellington Street =

Wellington Street may refer to:

- Wellington Street (Ottawa), Ontario, Canada
- Wellington Street, Hong Kong
- Wellington Street, London, England
- Wellington Street, Montreal, Quebec, Canada
- Wellington Street, Perth, Australia
- Wellington Street (Hamilton, Ontario), Canada
- Wellington Street (Toronto), Ontario, Canada
