= Vine staff =

Mark and tool of the centurion (Ancient Rome)

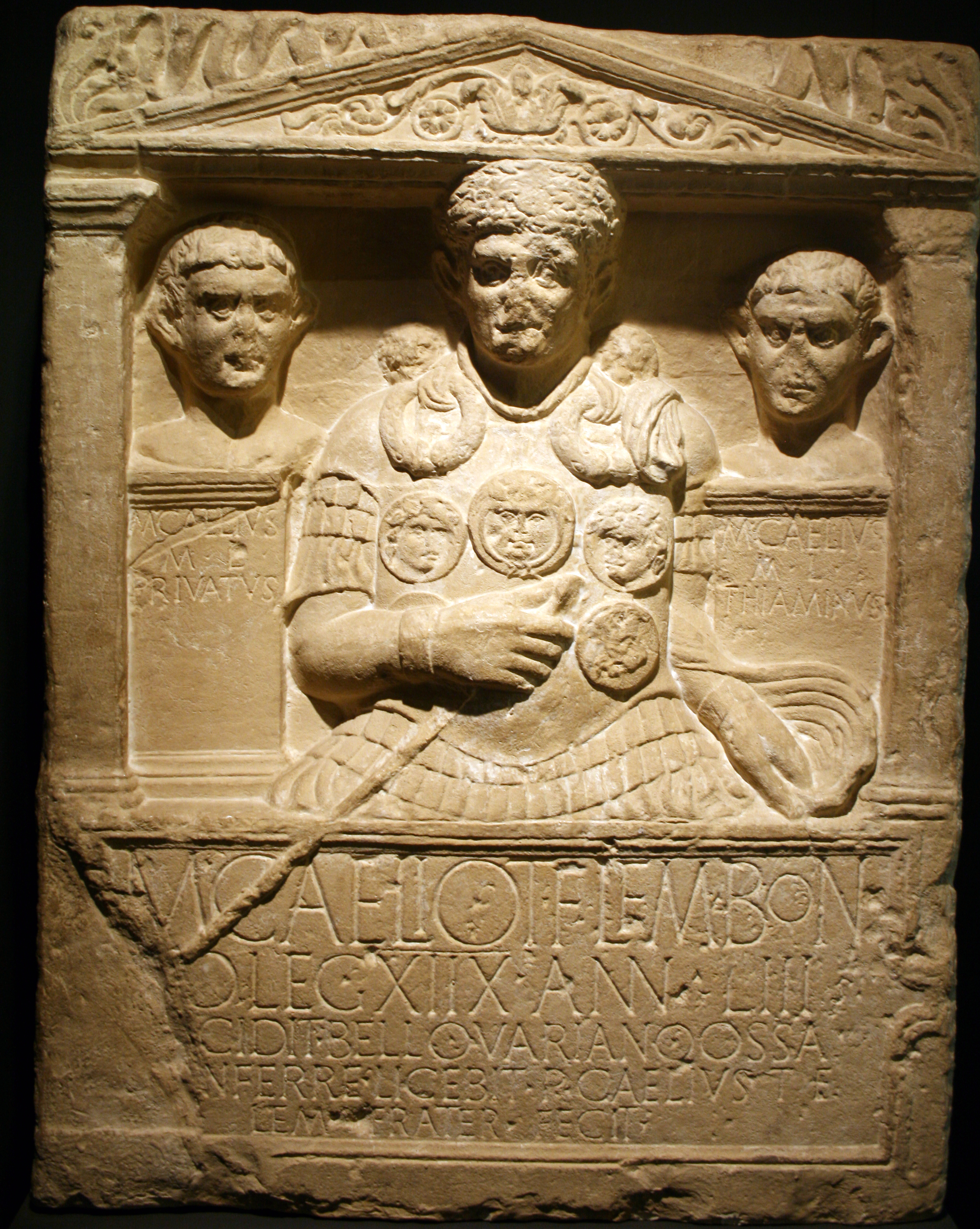
The epitaph of M. Caelius, chief centurion (primus pilus) of the ill-fated 18th Legion. His vine staff breaks the frame and even runs across the inscription.

The vine staff, vine-staff, or centurion's staff (Latin: vitis) was a vinewood rod of about 1 m (3 ft) in length used in the ancient Roman army and navy. It was the mark and tool of the centurion: both as an implement in the direction of drill and maneuvers and to beat wayward or laggard soldiers or sailors under his command. It was also borne by evocati who held an equivalent rank.

== Origin ==
The vine staff may have derived from the Etruscan lituus and was certainly in use by the Punic Wars. Following the enactment of the Porcian Laws in the early 2nd century BC, it was the only manner by which Roman citizens could be beaten and it is mentioned by various classical authors. Ovid notes that "the good general commits the vitis to one to command one hundred." Pliny notes that "The centurion's vine staff is an excellent medicine for sluggish troops who don't want to advance (...) (Note: Cited in Mannix.) and when used to chastise offenses makes even the punishment respectable." (Note: Cited in Gallonio.) It carried none of the stigma of the whipping (by virgae) suffered by criminals prior to execution or the cudgeling (by fustes) endured for severe military offenses.

Tacitus mentions Lucilius, a centurion known as "Gimme Another" (Cedo Alterum or Alteram) for his tendency to break his vine staffs during beatings; he was one of the first killed during the Pannonian Mutiny.

Generally, however, soldiers were expected to endure their punishments; seizing the vine staff was cause for demotion and breaking it or harming the centurion were offenses punishable by death. Some scholars state the vine staff was the instrument used to beat the Iceni queen Boadicca. St Marcellus the Centurion was martyred after he cast away his vine staff and repudiated his rank.

== Description ==
The vine staff is often featured on Roman tombs of the 1st through 4th century as a symbol of a centurion's status. These monuments show a variety of forms. During the early Principate, it was usually straight with a rounded top; it later acquired a mushroom-shaped head, which was continued under the Byzantines. Less often, it appeared in knotted and sinuous forms. One centurion gave his vine staff to the Temple of Jupiter at Heliopolis (modern Baalbek) as a votive offering. It was broken and given to the emperor Trajan when he inquired of the oracle of the Heliopolitan Jupiter whether he would survive his upcoming invasion of Parthia.

== See also ==
- Pace stick, a similar long stick used in the British and Commonwealth armed forces as a symbol of authority and as an aid to military drill
- Swagger stick, a similar rod or crop used in the British and American armed services
