= Batons of Arthur Wellesley, 1st Duke of Wellington =

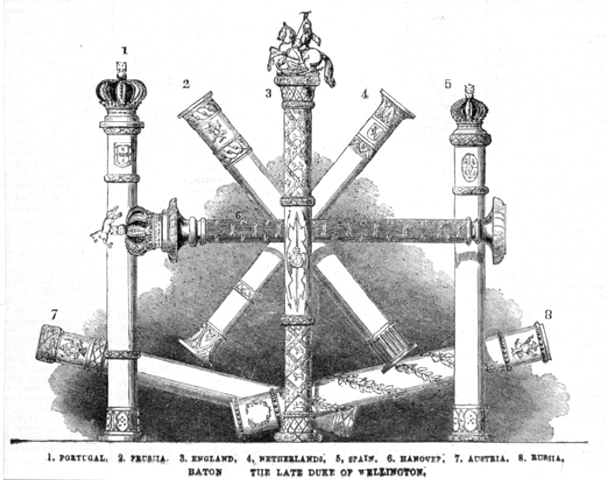
The Duke of Wellington's batons; from an engraving in The Illustrated London News printed following his death. 1. Portugal; 2. Prussia; 3. England; 4. the Netherlands; 5. Spain; 6. Hanover (lying across the engraving); 7. Austria; 8. Russia.

Arthur Wellesley, 1st Duke of Wellington, KG, GCB, GCH, PC, FRS (c. 1 May 1769 – 14 September 1852), acquired many titles and honours including the rank of field marshal or equivalent in eight nations' armies. Each nation provided him with a baton as a symbol of his rank. The surviving batons are on display at Apsley House, the former London residence of the Dukes of Wellington.

== Military rank ==
At Wellington's funeral his military ranks were described as:

- Field Marshal and Commander-in-Chief of Her [Britannic] Majesty's Forces
- Field Marshal of the Austrian Army
- Field Marshal of the Hanoverian Army
- Field Marshal of the Army of the Netherlands
- Marshal-General of the Portuguese Army
- Field Marshal of the Prussian Army
- Field Marshal of the Russian Army
- Captain-General of the Spanish Army

== Wellington's lying in state ==
At Wellington's lying in state, his batons of military rank were placed alongside the coffin on eight velvet cushions each on a pedestal on gold lion supporters. The pedestals were more than two feet in height, each bearing the shield and banners of their respective nations. On two additional similar pedestals were placed Wellington's standard and guidon. The batons were described thus:

- The Baton of Portugal is of burnished gold; it is surmounted by a crown, and on a shield are the arms of Portugal.
- The Baton of Prussia is of burnished gold, and is of classic ornamentation; it bears two eagles displayed, holding the sceptre and orb of sovereignty.
- The Baton of England is of gold, and is surmounted with the group of St. George and the Dragon. This baton is excessively rich in its decoration.
- The Baton of the Netherlands. This is one of the simplest, but perhaps the most elegant of the batons, the Greek ornaments being introduced very tastefully. The arms of the Netherlands are in the upper division.
- The Baton of Spain. Like that of Portugal, it is crowned; but it is shorter in its proportions. It is of burnished gold, and bears the armorial ensigns of Spain.
- The Baton of Hanover. The crown and ends of the staff are gold; but the chief part of the baton is covered with crimson velvet, powdered with silver horses—the Hanoverian arms; and a silver horse is placed above the crown.
- The Baton of Austria is of burnished gold, and the wreaths round it are in dead gold. The other portions are extremely plain.
- The Baton of Russia is of gold, and the alternate wreaths of laurel and oak, which twine round it; and the collars round the staff are set with diamonds of great value. The ground is frosted gold.

— J. H. Stocqueler (1854)

In Wellington's funeral procession, the Spanish baton was borne by Major-General the Duke of Osuna; the Russian baton by General Prince Gorchakov; the Prussian baton by General Count von Nostitz; the Portuguese baton by Marshal-General the Duke of Terceira; the Netherlands baton by Lieutenant-General Baron van Omphal; the Hanoverian baton by General Sir Hugh Halkett; and the English baton by Field-Marshal the Marquess of Anglesey.

== Display ==
For many years the batons were all on display at Apsley House. However, on 9 December 1965 there was a robbery in which three items were stolen, one of which was the Russian baton. It has not been recovered.

The seven remaining field marshal batons along with two more British batons (one presented to the Duke in 1821 by George IV) are on permanent display at Apsley House:

Above the fireplace is a frame (1981) containing ten of the Duke's batons – British (three, one presented by the Prince Regent in 1813), Portuguese (1809), Hanoverian (1844), Dutch, Spanish (1808), Austrian (1818), and Prussian, together with his staff as High Constable of England (1837 to 1838).

— Jervis & Tomlin

== English baton (1813) ==
The 1813 baton is described as English and not British because engraved on the end of it are the following words:

From his Royal Highness
George Augustus Frederick,
Regent
of the United Kingdom of
Great Britain and Ireland,
to Arthur, Marquess of Wellington, K. G.,
Field-Marshal of England.
1813.

The English baton was presented to the future Duke of Wellington for his military successes, but more specifically because after his victory at Vittoria he presented the captured Marshal's baton of Jean-Baptiste Jourdan to George, the Prince Regent (at the time prince regent as his father George III was deemed too mentally ill to govern). The Prince Regent wrote to Wellington "You have sent me among your trophies of unrivalled fame the staff of a French marshal, and I send you in return that of England".

== Russian baton ==
The Duke's Russian baton was stolen in 1965 and has not been recovered. The auctioneers Christie's stated that, "during the reign of Alexander I (1801–1825), only four Russian Generals and the Duke of Wellington received the coveted baton". A Russian baton circa 1878 (six were issued under Alexander II (1855–1881)) sold for $903,500 in a New York auction in 2004.

== See also ==
- List of titles and honours of Arthur Wellesley, 1st Duke of Wellington
- Military career of Arthur Wellesley, 1st Duke of Wellington
