= Swagger stick =

Short stick carried by an official as a symbol of authority

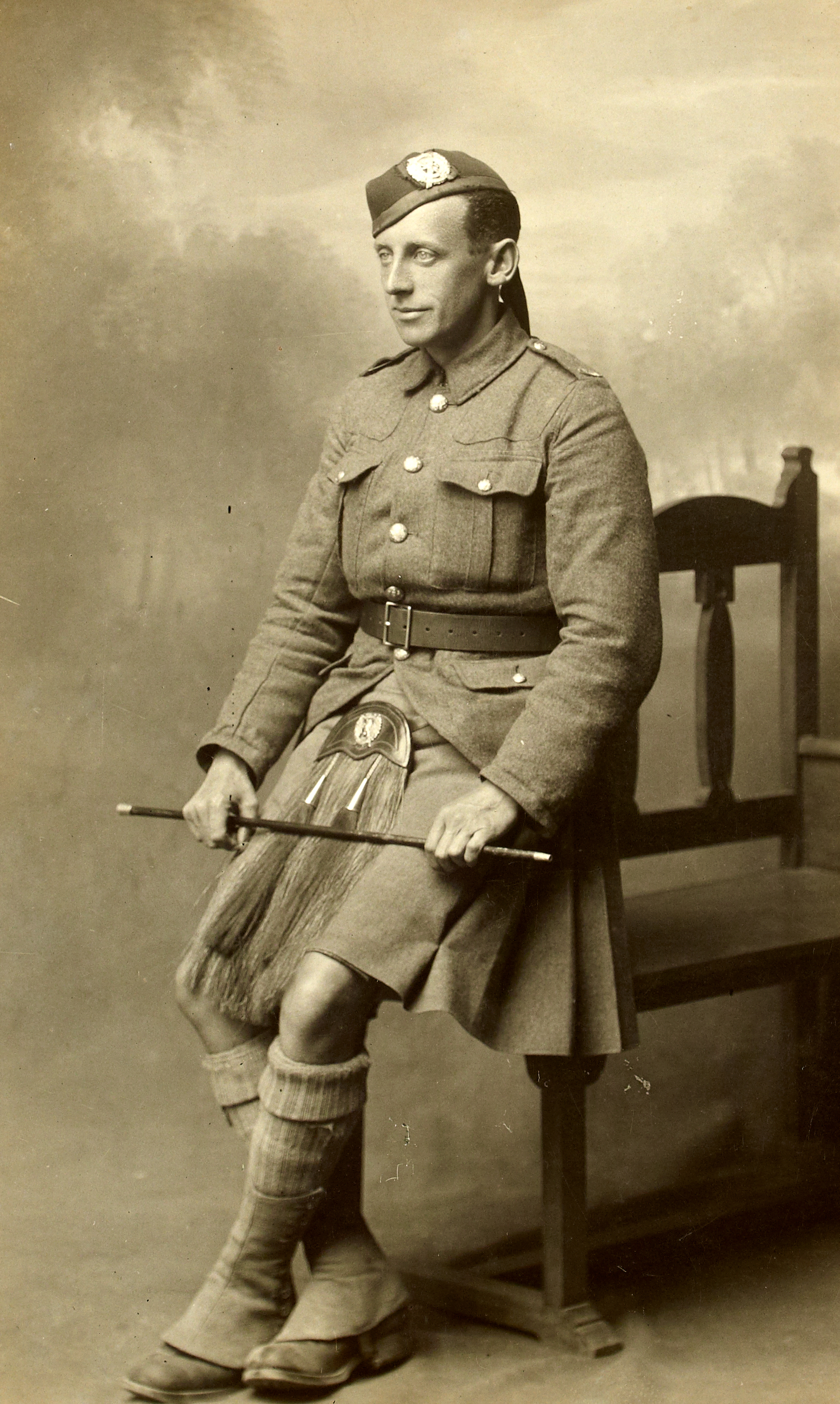
Scottish soldier with a swagger stick, 1921

A swagger stick is a short stick or riding crop usually carried by a uniformed person as a symbol of authority. A swagger stick is shorter than a staff or cane, and is usually made from rattan. Its use derives from the vine staff carried by Roman centurions as an emblem of office.

== United Kingdom ==
In the British Army before World War I, swagger sticks were carried by all other ranks when off duty, as part of their walking out uniform. The stick took the form of a short cane of polished wood, with an ornamented metal head of regimental pattern. The usual custom was for the private soldier or non-commissioned officer (NCO) to carry the stick tucked under his arm. Cavalrymen carried a small riding cane instead of the swagger stick of infantry and other branches.

In the British Army and other military forces following the Commonwealth traditions, commissioned officers of most infantry regiments formerly carried swagger sticks (described as canes) when on duty, whilst warrant officers and senior NCOs carried pace sticks instead. This practice continues in some regiments, especially by warrant officers when in Barrack Dress. Cavalry officers would often carry a riding crop rather than a swagger stick, in deference to their mounted traditions. In some Irish regiments in the British army, such as the Royal Irish Regiment (1992), officers carried a blackthorn walking stick, based on the shillelagh. In the Royal Tank Regiment, officers carried an 'ash plant' or walking stick instead, in reference to World War I tank attacks, when officers would prepare lines of advance by testing the ground's firmness and suitability for tanks.

== United States ==
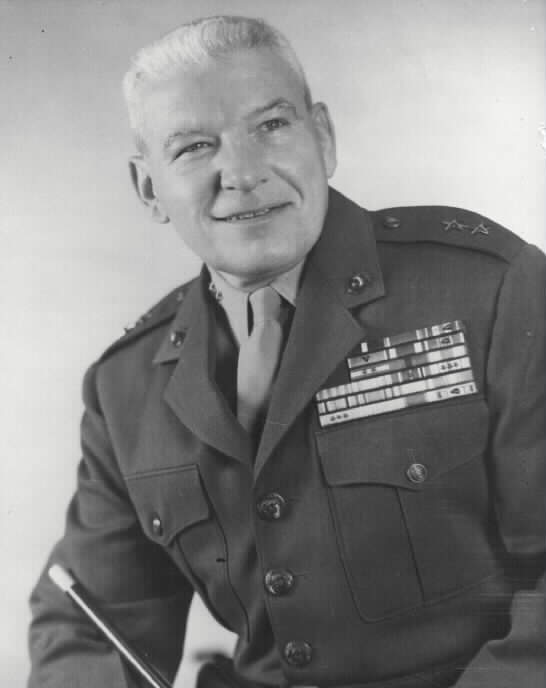
Homer Litzenberg holding a swagger stick in his official portrait in the late 1950s

Swagger sticks were once in vogue in the United States Marine Corps, starting as an informal accessory carried by officers in the late 19th century. In 1915, it gained official approval as recruiters were encouraged to carry them to improve their public image. This tradition grew when Marines deployed for World War I encountered European officers carrying swagger sticks, leading to an entry in the uniform regulations in 1922 authorizing enlisted marines to carry them as well. The usage died down in the 1930s and 40s, with the exception of China Marines, and came back into vogue with a 1952 regulation encouraging them, reaching a peak from 1956 to 1960 when on 4 January 1960, the Commandant, General David M. Shoup, commented on their use with regard to uniforms and equipment:

"There is one item of equipment about which I have a definite opinion. It is the swagger stick. It shall remain an optional item of interference. If you feel the need of it, carry it…"

General George S. Patton carried a swagger stick throughout World War II; however, his contained a concealed blade, similar to a Victorian gentleman's sword cane.

== See also ==
- Baton (military) – Military symbol
- Military rank – Element of hierarchy in armed forces
- Pace stick – Military drill aid
- Vine staff – Mark and tool of the centurion (Ancient Rome)
