= Gensui =

Gensui (元帥) may refer to:

- Grand marshal (大元帥 dai-gensui), highest rank in Greater Imperial Japanese Army and the Imperial Japanese Navy, held by the Emperor of Japan;
- Field marshal (元帥陸軍大将 gensui rikugun-taishō), OF-10 officer in Imperial Japanese Army;
  - Marshal (陸軍元帥 rikugun gensui), only held by Saigō Takamori in July 1872–May 1873.
- Marshal-admiral (元帥海軍大将 gensui kaigun-taishō), OF-10 officer in Imperial Japanese Navy.

== See also ==
- 元帥 Yuan shuai (Chinese), Wonsu (Korean, 원수), Nguyên soái (Vietnamese)
- 大元帥 Da yuan shuai (Chinese), Taewonsu (Korean, 대원수), Đại nguyên soái (Vietnamese)
