= Grand marshal =

Military rank

Grand marshal is a ceremonial, military, or political office of very high rank. The term has its origins with the word "marshal" with the first usage of the term "grand marshal" as a ceremonial title for certain religious orders. The following are some additional usages of the term grand marshal:

== Court ==
As a court title, a grand marshal is normally the supreme court official in a government legislative branch. Some examples include:

- Grootmaarschalk (in Dutch): The highest civilian official (not in the 'Military House') at the royal courts of Belgium (also grand maréchal in French). The Grand Marshal was often a member of the high nobility, namely Count Charles Jean d'Oultremont, who was Grand Marshal to King Leopold II. This ceremonial function was abolished in 2006, during the reign of Albert II.
- Marszalek wielki: grand marshal (at the court) of Poland or of Lithuania

== Ceremonial ==
- Grand marshal: One of the highest offices within the military Order of Teutonic Knights
- Grand marshal: Highest elected student leader of Rensselaer Polytechnic Institute.
- Grand marshal: A parade dignitary (for example, Grand Marshal of the Tournament of Roses Parade).
- Grand marshal: A person selected at an automobile race (e.g. NASCAR, IndyCar) by the track owner or race sponsor to be the public leader of events on race day or throughout the race weekend. They may have ceremonial duties such as giving the command to start engines, driving the pace car, waving the green flag to start the race, or presenting the trophy to the race winner.
- Grand marshal: Many Pride celebrations worldwide, such as San Francisco Pride and Los Angeles Pride, appoint grand marshals. These individuals are often described as "local heroes" or openly gay members of the LGBTQ community who have made significant contributions to society. In June 2015, for entertainment purposes, James Corden, the former host of The Late Late Show, campaigned to become the Grand Marshal of the LA Pride event to be held in 2016. Ottawa Capital Pride in Canada also follows this tradition, appointing a Grand Marshal who is a leader within the 2SLGBTQ+ community and recognized for their contributions through professional, personal, or volunteer work. The announcement of the Grand Marshal is made ahead of the annual Pride Parade during the lead-up to the Pride Festival.

== Military ==
- East Asian rank of 大元帥:
  - Dàyuánshuài: Grand Marshal of People's Liberation Army of the People's Republic of China, superior to Yuánshuài of the People's Liberation Army Ground Force and conferred for Mao Zedong and abolished at the start of the new rank system of People's Liberation Army in 1965.
  - Dai-gensui (Japanese: 大元帥): Grand marshal of the Empire of Japan. The highest title in the Imperial Japanese Army, held solely by the Emperor of Japan, the constitutional commander in chief. The rank was abolished at the end of World War II.
  - Taewonsu (Korean: 대원수): Grand marshal of North Korea, superior to the marshal rank of wonsu.
- Reichsmarschall: Marshal of the Reich (German: "realm" or "empire"). This rank was created especially for Hermann Göring in 1940, possibly in imitation of the rank of Reichsgeneralfeldmarschall held by the Catholic and Evangelical commanders-in-chief of the imperial armies in the Holy Roman Empire, held by such figures as Prince Eugene of Savoy and Archduke Charles, Duke of Teschen.
- First Marshal of the Empire (Italian: Primo maresciallo dell'Impero d'Italia) was the highest rank in the Italian military, held only by Victor Emmanuel III of Italy and Benito Mussolini. The rank was abolished following World War II.
- Grand Marshal of Ayacucho: The highest rank in the Venezuelan military, held only by Antonio José de Sucre.
- Grand Marshal of Nicaragua was the rank that Casto Fonseca appointed himself when he became the General Commander of Arms of Nicaragua, the de facto military ruler of the state, in 1839.
- Marshal General of France The highest rank in the French military.
- Marshal of Yugoslavia The highest rank in the Yugoslav People's Army, held only by Josip Broz Tito. The rank was abolished in 1980 after his death.
- Grand Marshal of Peru (Spanish: Gran Mariscal del Peru), commonly referred to as Marshal of Peru, is the highest rank in the Peruvian Army. It is conferred only to an officer who has been victorious at war.

== Fiction ==
Grand marshal often appears as a rank in science fiction sources, often in space or star fleets whose size requires a rank above such other titles as surface marshal and fleet admiral. Among grand marshal science fiction equivalents include:

- Grand marshal: Highest conjectural rank of the TIE fighter forces in the universe of Star Wars, equivalent to a grand admiral. This assumes that the TIE fighter forces are a separate branch of service from the Imperial Navy.
- Grand marshal: The 14th and highest PvP honor rank of the Alliance in World of Warcraft.
- Grand marshal: A rank held by Imperial Guard officers in the Warhammer 40,000 universe. It seems to be assigned to officers who command the armed forces of an entire planet. It is inferior to "lord commander militant".
- Grand Marshal: A parody of the Ford Crown Victoria in the soft body physics driving game Beamng.Drive.
- Grand Marshal: A rank held by the strongest shadow in Sung Jin-woo's army in the Solo Leveling universe. It is only held by Bellion.

== Sports ==
- Grand marshal: In motorsport racing of most kinds, with the track marshals, they wave flags throughout the track to communicate with the drivers and inform them about conditions on the track, like weather and other drivers' situations regarding the event.

== See also ==
- Marshal
- Field marshal
- Air marshal
- Generalissimo
