= Gensui (Imperial Japanese Army) =

Field marshal position in the Imperial Japanese Army

Rikugun-gensui 陸軍元帥
- Gensui Badge
- Country: Japanese Empire
- Service branch: Imperial Japanese Army
- Formation: 19 July 1872
- Abolished: 1945
- Next higher rank: Dai-gensui
- Next lower rank: General
- Equivalent ranks: Gensui (Navy)

Rikugun-gensui (陸軍元帥, Field marshal), formal rank designations: Gensui-rikugun-taishō (元帥陸軍大将, General with the title of marshal, Imperial Japanese Army) was the highest title in the pre-war Imperial Japanese military.

The title originated from the Chinese title yuanshuai (元帥).

The term gensui, which was used for both the Imperial Japanese Army and the Imperial Japanese Navy, was at first a rank held by Saigō Takamori as the Commander of the Armies (陸軍元帥 Rikugun-gensui) in 1872. However, in May 1873 Saigō was "demoted" to general, with gensui thereafter no longer a rank as such, but a largely honorific title awarded for extremely meritorious service to the Emperor - thus similar in concept to the French title of Marshal of France. Equivalent to a five-star rank (OF-10), it is similar to Field Marshal in the British Army and General of the Army in the United States Army.

While gensui would retain their actual ranks of general or admiral, they were entitled to wear an additional enamelled breast badge, depicting paulownia leaves between crossed army colors and a naval ensign under the Imperial Seal of Japan. They were also entitled to wear a special samurai sword (katana) of a modern design on ceremonial occasions.

In the Meiji period, the title was awarded to five generals and three admirals. In the Taishō period it was awarded to six generals and six admirals, and in the Shōwa period it was awarded to six generals and four admirals. The higher title of dai-gensui was comparable to the title of generalissimo and was held only by the Emperor himself.

== List of Rikugun-gensui ==
Note that several were promoted the same year they died; these were posthumous promotions.

Portrait	Name	Japanese name	Lifespan	Promotion date	From
	Saigō Takamori	西郷 隆盛	1828–1877	July 20, 1872 – May 8, 1873	Kagoshima
	Prince Komatsu Akihito	小松宮彰仁親王	1846–1903	January 20, 1898	Imperial Family
	Prince Yamagata Aritomo	山県 有朋	1838–1922	January 20, 1898	Yamaguchi
	Prince Ōyama Iwao	大山 厳	1842–1916	January 20, 1898	Kagoshima
	Marquis Nozu Michitsura	野津 道貫	1841–1908	January 31, 1906	Kagoshima
	Count Oku Yasukata	奥 保鞏	1847–1930	October 24, 1911	Fukuoka
	Count Hasegawa Yoshimichi	長谷川 好道	1850–1924	January 9, 1913	Yamaguchi
	Prince Fushimi Sadanaru	伏見宮貞愛親王	1858–1923	January 9, 1913	Imperial Family
	Baron Kawamura Kageaki	川村 景明	1850–1926	January 9, 1913	Kagoshima
	Count Terauchi Masatake	寺内 正毅	1852–1919	June 24, 1916	Yamaguchi
	Prince Kan'in Kotohito	閑院宮載仁親王	1865–1945	December 12, 1919	Imperial Family
	Baron Uehara Yūsaku	上原 勇作	1856–1933	April 27, 1921	Miyazaki
	Prince Kuniyoshi Kuni	久邇宮邦彦王	1873–1929	January 27, 1929 (posthumous)	Imperial Family
	Prince Nashimoto Morimasa	梨本宮守正王	1874–1951	August 8, 1932	Imperial Family
	Baron Nobuyoshi Mutō	武藤 信義	1868–1933	May 3, 1933	Saga
	Count Hisaichi Terauchi	寺内 寿一	1879–1946	June 21, 1943	Tokyo
	Hajime Sugiyama	杉山 元	1880–1945	June 21, 1943	Fukuoka
	Shunroku Hata	畑 俊六	1879–1962	June 2, 1944	Fukushima

The title was also bestowed on King George V of the United Kingdom on October 29, 1918.

== See also ==
- Gensui (Imperial Japanese Navy)
- Imperial Japanese Army
- 元帥：Pronounced as yuanshuai in Chinese, wonsu in Korean.
- 大元帥：A title higher than gensui, pronounced as dai-gensui in Japanese, da yuanshuai in Chinese, taewonsu in Korean.
- List of field marshals
