= Marshal of the People's Republic of China =

Military rank of the People's Liberation Army, 1955–1965

Marshal of the People's Republic of China 中华人民共和国元帅
- Shoulder board of the 1955 marshal's uniform
- Country: China
- Service branch: People's Liberation Army
- Formation: 27 September 1955
- Abolished: 1 June 1965

Marshal of the People's Republic of China
- Traditional Chinese: 中華人民共和國元帥
- Simplified Chinese: 中华人民共和国元帅
Transcriptions
Standard Mandarin
- Hanyu Pinyin: Zhōnghuá Rénmín Gònghéguó Yuánshuài

Marshal of the People's Republic of China (simplified Chinese: 中华人民共和国元帅; traditional Chinese: 中華人民共和國元帥; pinyin: Zhōnghuá Rénmín Gònghéguó Yuánshuài), also known as the founding marshals (Chinese: 开国元帅) or the ten marshals (Chinese: 十大元帅), was a military rank of the People's Liberation Army (PLA) that was conferred on ten senior Communist commanders in September 1955. It was the highest rank ever awarded in the PLA, since the higher rank of grand marshal was created but never conferred. The ten marshals were Zhu De, Peng Dehuai, Lin Biao, Liu Bocheng, He Long, Chen Yi, Luo Ronghuan, Xu Xiangqian, Nie Rongzhen and Ye Jianying. The rank was abolished together with the PLA's rank system in 1965, and it was not restored when ranks were reintroduced in 1988.

== History ==
=== Establishment of the rank system ===
In 1950, Zhu De called for a military rank system, and for ranks to be shown on uniforms from the following year if possible. The Korean War showed the need for ranks, because Chinese forces had none while the Korean People's Army did, which complicated relations between commanders. The Central Military Commission set up a committee to implement ranks on 17 February 1954, and on 21 October 1954 it decided that ranks would be introduced in 1955. In January 1955, the commission issued instructions on the evaluation of ranks, and the evaluation of officers began across the army.

On 8 February 1955, the sixth meeting of the Standing Committee of the 1st National People's Congress adopted the Regulations on the Service of Officers of the Chinese People's Liberation Army. The regulations created a system of officer ranks in four grades and 14 levels, in which the highest grade comprised the ranks of grand marshal and marshal. The full system, from marshal down to private, had six grades and 19 levels. It drew on the rank systems of the Soviet Union and North Korea, and China Military Online later described it as an "Eastern-type" system of the kind represented by the Soviet one. The rank of marshal was intended for senior commanders who had founded and led the people's armed forces, or had led campaign-level formations in battle, and who had rendered outstanding service. Candidates for the ranks of marshal and general were nominated by the party's Secretariat and approved by the Politburo.

=== Conferment ===
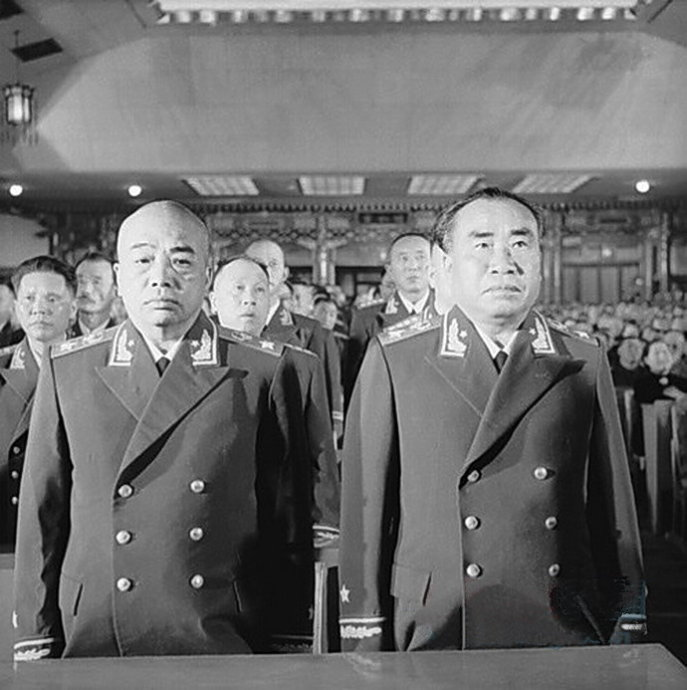
Zhu De and Peng Dehuai (left) at the Marshal of the People's Republic of China rank awarding ceremony

On 23 September 1955, the 22nd meeting of the Standing Committee of the 1st National People's Congress adopted a resolution conferring the rank of marshal on Zhu De and nine others. The ten were Zhu De, Peng Dehuai, Lin Biao, Liu Bocheng, He Long, Chen Yi, Luo Ronghuan, Xu Xiangqian, Nie Rongzhen and Ye Jianying. On 27 September 1955, a ceremony for the conferment of ranks and decorations was held in the Huairen Hall in Zhongnanhai. Mao personally presented the certificates of conferment to seven of the marshals, while Lin Biao, Liu Bocheng and Ye Jianying were away in Qingdao and Dalian and did not attend. On the same day, Zhou Enlai presented the certificates conferring general officer ranks in the Ziguang Pavilion. Ten officers were made senior generals, the rank immediately below marshal.

Liu Shaoqi (left) congratulates Zhu De following the rank awarding ceremony (1955)

=== Decorations ===
The marshals were also decorated under regulations on orders and medals for meritorious service in the revolutionary wars, which the Standing Committee of the National People's Congress adopted on 12 February 1955. The regulations created the Order of August 1, the Order of Independence and Freedom and the Order of Liberation, each in three classes, for service in the Red Army period, the war against Japan and the Civil War respectively. The first class of the Order of August 1 was meant for those who had been division-level cadres or above in the Red Army. The first class of the Order of Independence and Freedom was meant for those who had been brigade-level cadres or above when the Red Army was reorganised as the Eighth Route Army. The first class of the Order of Liberation was meant for those who had been army-level cadres or above in the Civil War.

All ten marshals received the first class of all three orders. At the ceremony of 27 September, Mao personally handed Zhu De his certificate of conferment together with the three orders.

=== Insignia ===
Uniform of the Marshal of the People's Republic of China with the hat and awards, at the Whampoa Military Academy Site-Memorial Hall in Guangzhou, China.

The marshal's insignia bore the national emblem and a star on a yellow background, while the star of the grand marshal's insignia was surrounded by a ring of wheat. From 1 October 1955, PLA personnel began to wear shoulder boards showing their rank, together with insignia of their arm and service, and to dress according to new uniform regulations.

=== Abolition ===
China Military Online wrote that by the early 1960s, many regarded military ranks as dogmatic or bourgeois and ill-suited to the PLA, and that flaws in the system itself strengthened calls for its abolition. On 22 May 1965, the ninth meeting of the Standing Committee of the 3rd National People's Congress approved a proposal by the State Council to abolish the PLA's rank system, which took effect on 1 June 1965. Ranks were reintroduced on 1 October 1988. While the new regulations were being drafted, some members of the Standing Committee argued for a marshal rank, and one proposed that it be conferred on Deng Xiaoping, but Deng said that he would not become a marshal and proposed that no marshal rank be set in peacetime. The regulations adopted on 1 July 1988 made first-class general the highest rank, which established in law that there would be no marshal rank in peacetime.

== Recipients ==
The ten marshals, in order of precedence, were:

No.	Name	Portrait	Born	Birthplace	Died	Age at conferment	Career highlights	Ref.
1	Zhu De 朱德		December 1, 1886	Yilong, Sichuan	July 6, 1976, Beijing	68	Founding leader of the Chinese Red Army and played a key role in the Long March and major battles in the Chinese Civil War. Zhu commanded the Eighth Route Army during the Second Sino-Japanese War and held high-ranking government and military positions after the founding of the People's Republic of China in 1949.	
2	Peng Dehuai 彭德怀		October 24, 1898	Xiangtan, Hunan	November 29, 1974, Beijing	56	A commander in the Chinese Red Army during the early period of the Chinese Communist Revolution, Peng played a leading role in battles during the Chinese Civil War and the Long March. During the Second Sino-Japanese War, he served as Deputy Commander-in-Chief of the Eighth Route Army, overseeing campaigns in North China. In the Civil War, he commanded the Northwest Field Army. Post-1949, Peng became the Minister of National Defense and Vice Chairman of the Central Military Commission, playing a pivotal role in modernizing China's military. He also commanded People's Volunteer Army during the Korean War. In 1959, he was dismissed from his positions after criticizing the Great Leap Forward at the Lushan Conference in 1959. Persecuted during the Cultural Revolution, he died in Beijing in 1974, and he was posthumously rehabilitated in 1978.	
3	Lin Biao 林彪		December 5, 1907	Huanggang, Hubei	September 13, 1971, Mongolia	47	Key military leader in the Chinese Red Army, Lin was noted for his role in the Long March and his victories during the Civil War, particularly in the Liaoshen and Pingjin campaigns that ensured Communist control of Northern China. During the Second Sino-Japanese War, he commanded the 115th Division of the Eighth Route Army, achieving a major victory at the Battle of Pingxingguan. After the founding of the People's Republic of China in 1949, Lin served as Minister of National Defense, Vice Chairman of the Central Military Commission, and played a significant role in the early stages of the Cultural Revolution. His career ended controversially with his alleged coup attempt against Mao Zedong and subsequent death in plane crash in Mongolia while escaping, in 1971. He was afterwards condemned as a conspirator and a traitor, and in 1981 the Supreme People’s Court held him responsible for counter-revolutionary activities. His legacy has remained politically sensitive and contested in China.	
4	Liu Bocheng 刘伯承		December 4, 1892	Kaixian, Sichuan (now Chongqing)	October 7, 1986, Beijing	62	He commanded the 129th Division of the Eighth Route Army, and in the Civil War he played a leading part in campaigns including the Huaihai campaign. After 1949, he became a leading military educator and a vice chairman of the Central Military Commission.	
5	He Long 贺龙		March 22, 1896	Sangzhi, Hunan	June 9, 1969, Beijing	59	The only marshal from an ethnic minority, the Tujia, he was a leader of the Nanchang uprising and commanded the 120th Division of the Eighth Route Army. After 1949, he was a vice premier and headed the state sports commission. He was persecuted during the Cultural Revolution and died in 1969. The party restored his reputation in 1974 and fully rehabilitated him in 1982.	
6	Chen Yi 陈毅		August 26, 1901	Lezhi, Sichuan	January 6, 1972, Beijing	54	A leader of the New Fourth Army during the war against Japan, he led the Communist forces in East China in the Civil War. After 1949, he was mayor of Shanghai, and later Minister of Foreign Affairs and a vice premier.	
7	Luo Ronghuan 罗荣桓		November 26, 1902	Hengshan, Hunan	December 16, 1963, Beijing	52	A senior political commissar, he served with the 115th Division in Shandong during the war against Japan, and in Northeast China during the Civil War. After 1949, he headed the PLA's General Political Department.	
8	Xu Xiangqian 徐向前		November 8, 1901	Wutai, Shanxi	September 21, 1990, Beijing	53	He took part in the Guangzhou uprising and later commanded the Red Army's Fourth Front Army. He was deputy commander of the 129th Division during the war against Japan, and after 1949 he was Chief of the General Staff and later Minister of National Defense.	
9	Nie Rongzhen 聂荣臻		December 29, 1899	Jiangjin, Sichuan (now Chongqing)	May 14, 1992, Beijing	55	Political commissar of the Red Army's First Army Group on the Long March, he led the Jin-Cha-Ji Border Region base during the war against Japan. After 1949, he directed China's defence science and technology programmes and became a vice premier.	
10	Ye Jianying 叶剑英		April 28, 1897	Meixian, Guangdong	October 22, 1986, Beijing	58	Only Marshal from Guangdong and a Hakka, Ye participated in the Nanchang and Guangzhou Uprisings, later serving as Chief of Staff for the Fourth Army of the National Revolutionary Army and in senior roles in the Chinese Red Army. During the Second Sino-Japanese War, he became the Chief of Staff of the Eighth Route Army and worked on maintaining the relations between Nationalists and Communists. In the Civil War, he played a significant role in reorganizing military strategies of the Communist force. Post-1949, Ye served as the Mayor of Guangzhou and Chairman of Guangdong, contributing to the consolidation of Communist authority in South China. He later became Vice Chairman of the Central Military Commission, Minister of National Defense and held leadership roles in the National People's Congress and the State Council, including briefly acting as the de facto head of state.	

The average age of the marshals at their conferment was 57, and Lin Biao was the youngest, at 48. Lin was second from last in seniority, but first in his record of battle achievements. Luo Ronghuan was the first of the marshals to die, in 1963, and Nie Rongzhen was the last, in 1992. Lin Biao, who died in Mongolia, was the only one of the ten who did not die in Beijing.

== Commemoration ==
At the celebration of the 90th anniversary of the PLA in August 2017, Xi Jinping paid tribute to Mao Zedong, Zhou Enlai, Liu Shaoqi, Zhu De and Deng Xiaoping, and to Peng Dehuai, Liu Bocheng, He Long, Chen Yi, Luo Ronghuan, Xu Xiangqian, Nie Rongzhen and Ye Jianying, as the revolutionaries and military leaders who had founded and built the army. Lin Biao was not among those named.

== See also ==
- Yuanshuai
- Dayuanshuai
- Ranks of the People's Liberation Army Ground Force
