= Xu Xiangqian =

Chinese marshal

Marshal Xu Xiangqian
- 徐向前
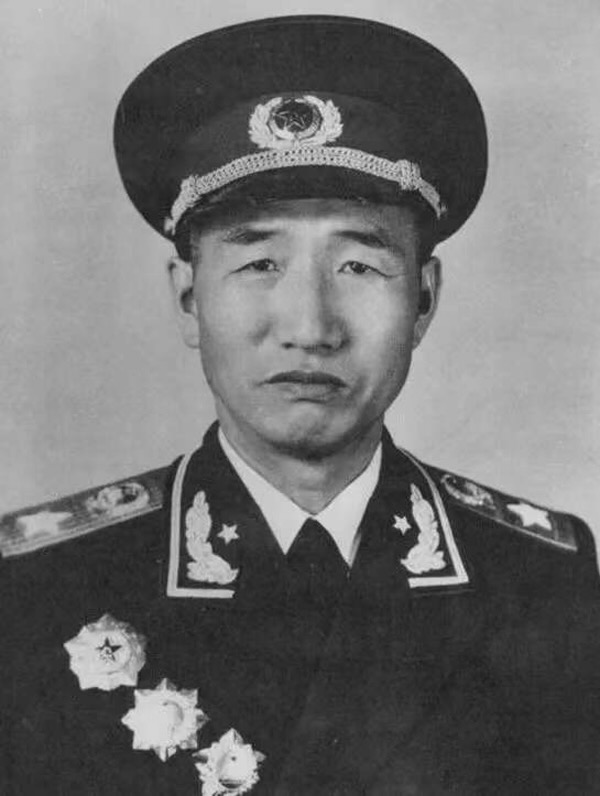
- Marshal Xu Xianqian (1955)

Vice Chairman of the Central Military Commission
- In office 8 January 1966 – 1 November 1987
- Chairman: Mao Zedong; Hua Guofeng; Deng Xiaoping

4th Minister of National Defense
- In office 26 February 1978 – 6 March 1981
- Premier: Hua Guofeng; Zhao Ziyang
- Preceded by: Ye Jianying
- Succeeded by: Geng Biao

Vice Premier of China
- In office March 1978 – September 1980
- Premier: Hua Guofeng

Personal details
- Born: November 8, 1901 Wutai County, Shanxi, Qing China
- Died: September 21, 1990 (aged 88) Beijing, China
- Occupation: General; politician; writer
- Nickname(s): "The cotton-clad marshal" (bù yī yuán shuài, 布衣元帅)

Military service
- Allegiance: China
- Branch/service: People's Liberation Army Ground Force
- Years of service: 1924–1987
- Rank: Marshal of the People's Republic of China
- Commands: Commander, 4th Front Army, Chinese Red Army; Deputy Commander, PLA North China Military Region Field Army; Commander and Political Commissar, 1st Corps of the North China Field Army; Chief of the General Staff, CPG People's Revolutionary Military Commission; Minister of National Defense, PRC
- Battles/wars: Northern Expedition; Chinese Civil War; Long March; Sino-Japanese War; Sino-Vietnamese War

Xu Xiangqian (8 November 1901 – 21 September 1990) was a Chinese military commander and politician, and one of the ten Marshals of the People's Republic of China. A graduate of the first class of the Whampoa Military Academy, he joined the Chinese Communist Party (CCP) in 1927, and he commanded the Fourth Front Army of the Chinese Red Army in the Eyuwan Soviet and the Sichuan–Shaanxi base area. After the defeat of the Western Route Army in 1937, he served under Mao Zedong as deputy commander of the 129th Division of the Eighth Route Army during the Second Sino-Japanese War. In the final phase of the Chinese Civil War, his forces took Shanxi from Yan Xishan, ending with the capture of Taiyuan in April 1949.

After the founding of the People's Republic of China, Xu was the first Chief of the General Staff, and he was made a marshal in 1955. He was purged during the Cultural Revolution for his part in the February Countercurrent, but he returned to the leadership in the 1970s. From 1978 to 1981, he was Minister of National Defense. He retired from his last post, as vice chairman of the Central Military Commission, in 1987.

== Early life ==
Xu was born on 8 November 1901 in Yong'an village, near Dongye, in Wutai County, Shanxi. His birth name was written with different characters but pronounced in the same way, and his courtesy name was Zijing. His father, Xu Maohuai, had passed the county-level civil service examination of the Qing dynasty. Western accounts describe Xu as the son of a wealthy landowner, but in his memoirs he wrote that the family had declined after his grandfather's business failed. People's Daily described his father as a poor village teacher. At the age of ten, Xu was sent to a private school, but he later had to leave school because of his family's poverty, and he spent two and a half years as an apprentice in a relative's bookshop in Fuping, Hebei.

In 1919, on the advice of his elder brother, he entered the Shanxi Provincial National Normal School in Taiyuan, which had been founded by the provincial governor, Yan Xishan. After graduating, he worked as a schoolteacher.

== Whampoa and the Northern Expedition ==
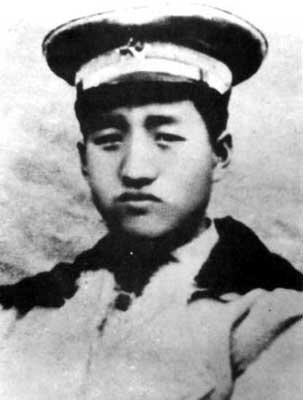
Xu in the National Revolutionary Army (1924)

In early 1924, Xu learned that the Kuomintang (KMT) government in Guangzhou was recruiting cadets for a new military academy, and he traveled to Shanghai with several other men from Shanxi to sit the entrance examination. Despite his parents' objections, he enrolled in the first class of the Whampoa Military Academy in April 1924, and he joined the KMT. After graduating in November 1924, he served as a platoon commander in the academy's training units. In 1925, he took part in the Eastern Expedition against the warlord Chen Jiongming.

Xu was then sent to Henan to serve in the army of Feng Yuxiang, where he was an instructor, a staff officer and a deputy regimental commander. He held various officer posts in the National Revolutionary Army between 1925 and 1927, and in 1926 he took part in Chiang Kai-shek's Northern Expedition against the northern warlords. In November 1926, he moved to Wuhan, where he became an instructor in a student regiment, and he later taught at the Central Military and Political School in Wuchang. While teaching there, he joined the Chinese Communist Party in March 1927. In May 1927, he led a unit of cadets against the forces of Xia Douyin and Yang Sen.

== Chinese Civil War, 1927–1937 ==
=== Guangzhou Uprising ===
After the end of the alliance between the Nationalists and the Communists in 1927, Xu went underground. He did not take part in the Nanchang uprising, but the party sent him to Guangzhou, and in December 1927 he took part in the Guangzhou Uprising as commander of the 6th Regiment of the Workers' Red Guards. After the uprising failed, the surviving rebels were reorganized as the 4th Division of the Workers' and Peasants' Revolutionary Army, and Xu rose to become its chief of staff and then its commander. The division joined the forces of Peng Pai in the Hailufeng area of eastern Guangdong, where it was largely destroyed. Xu escaped through Kowloon to Shanghai, and the party then sent him to the Dabie Mountains.

=== Eyuwan Soviet ===
In June 1929, Xu became deputy commander of the 31st Division of the Red Army on the border of Hubei and Henan, and he won several engagements against local Nationalist forces. In late 1929, he married Cheng Xunxuan, a woman serving in the Red Army. In 1930, he became deputy commander of the Red 1st Army and commander of its 1st Division, and he fought in the first Nationalist encirclement campaign against the Eyuwan Soviet. The Red 1st Army and the Red 15th Army were merged in early 1931 to form the Fourth Red Army, which numbered about 20,000 soldiers by some Western accounts. Some Western accounts describe Xu as its first commander, but according to his memoirs he was initially its chief of staff, and he became its commander in July 1931.

Later in 1931, the party's Central Committee put Zhang Guotao in charge of the Eyuwan Soviet. Zhang soon clashed with the local military leaders over strategy, and in late 1931 he launched a purge in which several senior commanders were executed. According to the historian William T. Rowe and Christopher Lew, Xu sided with Zhang, even though his own wife was among those purged. In his memoirs, Xu wrote that he had no authority over political matters, and that he learned of his wife's killing only in 1937.

In November 1931, the Fourth Front Army was formed, with Xu as its commander-in-chief. It grew to about 30,000 men. During the third Nationalist encirclement campaign, Xu won a series of victories at Huang'an, Shangcheng and Sujiabu, using the tactic of besieging a town to ambush the forces sent to relieve it. In the Sujiabu campaign of 1932, his forces destroyed three Nationalist divisions and captured the Nationalist commander in western Anhui.

In mid-1932, Chiang Kai-shek took personal command of a fourth encirclement campaign, and his forces advanced in close formation to avoid the Red Army's ambushes. After heavy losses, Xu and the other commanders decided to withdraw the main force from the Eyuwan Soviet in October 1932, leaving Xu Haidong to continue guerrilla warfare there with the 25th Red Army. The army broke out of an encirclement at Manchuanguan on 13 November 1932, crossed the Qinling mountains, and in December crossed the Daba Mountains into northern Sichuan, with about 14,400 men remaining.

=== Sichuan–Shaanxi base area ===
In northern Sichuan, the Fourth Front Army established the Sichuan–Shaanxi base area around Tongjiang and Bazhong. In 1933, Xu defeated a three-pronged offensive by the Sichuan warlord Tian Songyao, whose forces suffered about 24,000 casualties over four months. During the campaign, Zhang Guotao carried out a second purge, in which Zeng Zhongsheng and other commanders were killed. After the campaign, the army was reorganized into four corps with about 40,000 men, and Xu became vice chairman of the Northwest Revolutionary Military Commission. Between August and October 1933, he led three offensives that captured eight county towns, and the army grew to more than 80,000 men.

In late 1933, the Sichuan warlords united under Liu Xiang, who sent more than 200,000 troops against the base area in six columns. Xu adopted a strategy of active defense, drawing the enemy deep into the base area before counter-attacking. After a ten-month campaign, the offensive was defeated, and the Sichuan armies lost more than 80,000 men. The Red Army lost about 20,000 men, and the base area was left exhausted and short of supplies.

=== Long March ===
In 1934, Chiang Kai-shek's forces defeated the main Red Army in Jiangxi, forcing it to set out on the Long March. In early 1935, the Fourth Front Army crossed the Jialing River and took the Jianmen Pass, and it then abandoned the Sichuan–Shaanxi base area and moved west. On 13 June 1935, it met the Central Red Army at Dawei, near Maogong. After the meeting, the Central Revolutionary Military Commission awarded Xu a first-class Red Star Medal.

The two armies soon disagreed over strategy. Mao and the Central Committee favored moving north, while Zhang Guotao wanted to move south and west. At the Maoergai conference, Xu supported the northward route, and he was put in command of the right column, which won a victory at Baozuo in August 1935. According to Christopher Lew, Zhang considered attacking Mao's forces, but Xu refused, and this may have contributed to Mao's later acceptance of Xu under his own leadership. When Mao asked for his view on 9 September 1935, Xu replied that the armies should not divide again. The next night, the Central Committee left with the troops of the former Central Red Army, and Xu, who learned of their departure the following morning, wept. To keep the Fourth Front Army intact, he led his remaining troops south to rejoin Zhang Guotao.

In October 1935, Zhang set up a rival Central Committee, and the Fourth Front Army moved south, where it suffered heavy losses at Baizhangguan. In 1936, it moved to Garzê, where it joined the Second Front Army in July, and the combined forces then marched north. In October 1936, Xu's forces reached Huining, where the three main Red Armies met at the end of the Long March.

=== Western Route Army ===
Xu (left) with Ye Jianying (1937)

In late October 1936, part of the Fourth Front Army crossed the Yellow River to open a route to the Soviet Union, but Nationalist forces then cut it off from the rest of the Red Army. In November, the force was renamed the Western Route Army, with Xu as its commander-in-chief and Chen Changhao as its political commissar. The army received conflicting orders about whether to advance west towards Xinjiang or to build a base in the Hexi Corridor, and Xu and Chen also disagreed over strategy. The army was gradually destroyed by the cavalry of the Ma clique, and its 5th Corps was wiped out at Gaotai in January 1937. By March 1937, only about 3,000 men remained, and the army's military and political committee ordered Xu and Chen to return to Yan'an. Of the remaining troops, only a column of about 700 men under Li Xiannian reached Xinjiang.

Xu made his way back in disguise, begging along the way, and reached Yan'an through Pingliang and Xi'an. He arrived during the campaign against Zhang Guotao's "line", in which many former Fourth Front Army officers were criticized or detained. Xu was allowed to remain in the Red Army under Mao's leadership after making an extensive self-criticism. According to Xu's memoirs, Mao consoled him by saying that "as long as the green hills remain, there will be no shortage of firewood".

== Second Sino-Japanese War ==
At the Luochuan Conference in August 1937, Xu was made a member of the party's Revolutionary Military Commission. When the Red Army was reorganized as the Eighth Route Army, he was appointed deputy commander of the 129th Division under Liu Bocheng. The post was effectively a demotion. Because he was a native of Shanxi, he accompanied Zhou Enlai in September 1937 to negotiate with Yan Xishan and Fu Zuoyi over the division's operations in the province. He then took part in the division's guerrilla campaigns in Shanxi, including the battles of Shentouling and Xiangtangpu in 1938.

In April 1938, Xu led a column across the Taihang Mountains into southern Hebei, where he set up the South Hebei base area. In May 1939, the party sent him to Shandong, where, in August, he became commander of the Eighth Route Army's 1st Column, which unified the command of the communist forces in Shandong and northern Jiangsu. There, he worked with Luo Ronghuan to build bases in communist-controlled areas. In 1940, he returned to Yan'an, where he broke his shin after being kicked by a horse.

In May 1942, he became deputy commander and chief of staff of the Shaanxi–Gansu–Ningxia–Shanxi–Suiyuan Joint Defense Army under He Long. In 1943, he was appointed president of the Counter-Japanese Military and Political University. In July 1944, he fell seriously ill, and he was unable to attend the 7th National Congress of the CCP in 1945.

== Chinese Civil War, 1946–1949 ==
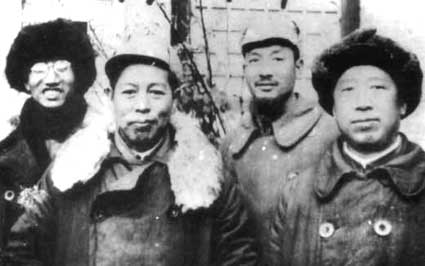
The leaders of the Shanxi-Hebei-Shandong-Henan Military Region. From left to right: Xu Xiangqian, Wang Shiying, Zhou Shidi and Teng Daiyuan (1947)

In June 1947, Xu was appointed deputy commander of the Shanxi–Hebei–Shandong–Henan Military Region, with responsibility for operations in Shanxi. Most of the region's regular forces had moved south with Liu Bocheng and Deng Xiaoping, and Xu was left with about 50,000 local troops who had little experience of attacking cities. In December 1947, after earlier failed attacks, his forces took Yuncheng, which cut Yan Xishan's link with the south of the province.

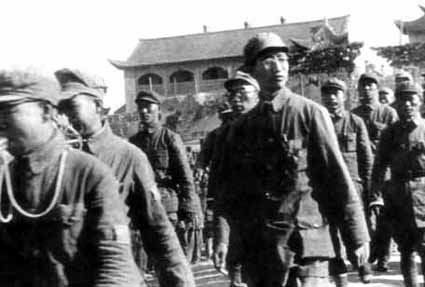
Xu reviews the Linfen Brigade during the Linfen Campaign (1948)

In March 1948, Xu began the siege of Linfen, a heavily fortified city defended by about 25,000 troops. After 72 days of fighting, in which his forces used tunnels and explosives to breach the walls, the city fell on 17 May 1948, at a cost of about 15,000 communist casualties. In May 1948, he became deputy commander of the North China Military Region and commander and political commissar of the 1st Army Group of the North China Field Army. In the Jinzhong campaign of June and July 1948, his force of fewer than 60,000 men destroyed about 100,000 of Yan Xishan's troops, and Chinese military historians regard the campaign as a classic victory of a smaller force over a larger one.

Xu then besieged Taiyuan, the provincial capital and Yan Xishan's last stronghold, whose arsenal was described by Time as the largest in China south of the Great Wall. The Taiyuan campaign began in October 1948, and Xu, who was suffering from pleurisy, directed the fighting from a stretcher. After a pause during the Pingjin campaign, the final assault began on 20 April 1949, and the city fell on 24 April. His ill health then forced him to give up his command, and he went to Qingdao for treatment.

== People's Republic of China ==
=== Early years ===
After the founding of the People's Republic of China in October 1949, Xu became a member of the Central People's Government Council and of the People's Revolutionary Military Commission, and he was appointed Chief of the General Staff of the People's Liberation Army (PLA). He may not have been active as Chief of the General Staff, and he was formally succeeded by Su Yu in 1954. In 1951, after recovering from his illness, he led a delegation to Moscow to negotiate the purchase of weapons for 60 divisions and Soviet help in building arms factories, and the talks ended with an agreement in October.

Xu (front, right) at the Marshal of the People's Republic of China rank awarding ceremony (1955)

From 1954, Xu was a vice chairman of the National Defense Council, with responsibility for the air force and air defense. In 1955, he was named one of the ten marshals of the PLA, the only northerner to receive the rank. From 1963, he was in charge of the militia. He became a vice chairman of the Standing Committee of the National People's Congress in 1965, and on 8 January 1966 he was appointed a vice chairman of the Central Military Commission.

=== Cultural Revolution ===
In August 1966, Xu was elected to the Politburo of the CCP. In January 1967, Mao appointed him head of the All-Army Cultural Revolution Group, with Jiang Qing as its adviser, and Mao insisted that Xu take the post despite his reluctance. According to the memoirs of Qiu Huizuo, Xu initially supported the extension of the Cultural Revolution to the army, before changing his position and asking to step down on grounds of illness. On 19 and 20 January 1967, at meetings in the Jingxi Hotel, Xu, Ye Jianying and Nie Rongzhen clashed with members of the Cultural Revolution Group over the campaign in the army. On 24 January, Xu went to Lin Biao's residence to demand rules to keep the army stable, and the resulting directive, approved by Mao on 28 January, became the Military Commission's eight-point order.

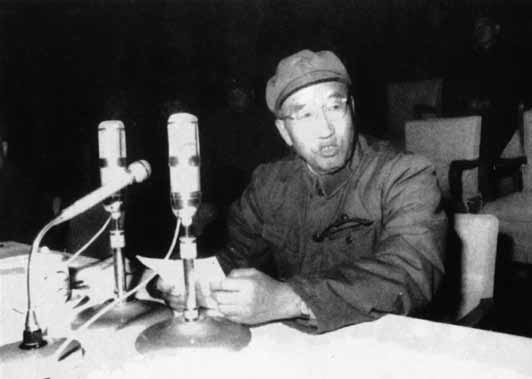
Xu giving a speech at a conference for military academies, and cultural and sports units at the Beijing Workers' Gymnasium (1966)

In February 1967, Xu was part of the February Countercurrent, a group of leaders who criticized the Cultural Revolution for creating chaos and undermining China's leadership. Afterwards, Mao required him to request a leave of absence and to make a self-criticism. He was accused of opposing Lin Biao and of sabotaging the Cultural Revolution. His home was ransacked by Red Guards in April and July 1967, the second time by a group led by Kuai Dafu. He was criticized again at the 9th National Congress in 1969, but he was re-elected to the Central Committee. In 1969, he was sent to work at a locomotive factory, and in October of that year he was evacuated from Beijing to Kaifeng under Lin Biao's "Order Number One", where he lived in semi-confinement. He returned to Beijing in 1971.

=== Minister of National Defense ===
In March 1978, Xu was appointed a vice premier and Minister of National Defense. Addressing the army delegation to the National People's Congress that month, he praised Hua Guofeng as the army's commander for his decisive action against the Gang of Four. On 31 July 1978, People's Daily published his article "Heighten vigilance and be prepared to fight", in which he argued that a new world war could be postponed but not avoided, and that people's war remained the core of Mao's military thought. He also argued for a well-trained and well-equipped army, and he supported the use of foreign military technology, a departure from Maoist self-reliance. To build support for his ideas, he made alarming predictions of imminent conflict with the Soviet Union.

After the Third Plenum of December 1978, Xu chaired a symposium of the Central Military Commission that ran into January 1979. According to the historians Frederick Teiwes and Warren Sun, the meeting became a clash of old grievances, and Xu lost control of it and called in Deng Xiaoping, who closed the meeting. On 1 January 1979, the day that China and the United States established diplomatic relations, Xu announced that he had ordered the troops on the Fujian front to stop shelling Greater and Lesser Jinmen, Dadan, Erdan and other islands held by the Republic of China. The statement said that the order was intended to make it easier for people on Taiwan, Penghu, Jinmen and Mazu to visit relatives on the mainland, and it ended the bombardment that had begun in the Second Taiwan Strait Crisis of 1958.

==== Sino-Vietnamese War ====
In December 1978 and January 1979, when Deng Xiaoping proposed a punitive war against Vietnam, Xu, Ye Jianying and Nie Rongzhen had strong reservations, because they believed that China was unprepared for war. According to the recollection of Wang Shangrong, a deputy chief of the General Staff, the three marshals agreed that a war should not be undertaken lightly, but they conceded once Deng made his intention clear. As defense minister, Xu then took part in the decision-making and direction of the war, which lasted from 17 February to 16 March 1979. After the war, he helped to organize the streamlining of the army's command organs.

The political scientist Joshua Eisenman wrote that, after the war, Xu used the PLA's poor performance to press for military modernization. In an article in the party journal Red Flag, published on 2 October 1979 under the title "Strive to achieve the modernization of national defense", he argued that the campaign had given the army experience in all aspects of warfare and should be studied for its lessons. He wrote that defeats often resulted from backward military thinking among commanders rather than from poor weapons, and that changes in personnel, doctrine and operations were needed before modern weapons could be used effectively. He also wrote that China must not relax its vigilance against war while it concentrated on economic modernization. According to Teiwes and Sun, the article openly supported the views of General Su Yu on military strategy.

Xu stepped down as vice premier in 1980, and as defense minister in 1981. At a Politburo meeting on 15 January 1981 that discussed the sentences of the Gang of Four, he was the only participant to argue that Jiang Qing should not be executed, according to his official chronology.

=== Later years ===
At the 12th National Congress in 1982, Xu was re-elected to the Politburo and as a vice chairman of the Central Military Commission. In 1984, he became president of the Whampoa Military Academy Alumni Association. In the 1980s, he argued in internal letters that the Soviet Union should still be regarded as a socialist country and not as China's main threat, and that the United States was the main long-term threat. In September 1985, he resigned from the Politburo and the Central Committee, along with Nie Rongzhen and Ye Jianying, but he kept his post on the Central Military Commission. He left the Central Military Commission in November 1987, at the age of 86.

During the Tiananmen Square protests of 1989, Xu and Nie Rongzhen issued statements that called for public order but warned that the PLA should not resort to bloodshed to suppress the protests. On 21 May 1989, when a group of students from the University of Science and Technology of China came to his home to ask him to speak out, his staff told them that the troops would try to avoid bloodshed, and Xu endorsed this reply. After the crackdown, on 13 June 1989, he published a letter to the martial law troops, praising them for defending the party's leadership and the socialist system.

== Death ==
In June 1990, Xu was admitted to hospital after a recurrence of tuberculosis. He died in Beijing on 21 September 1990, at the age of 88. In his will, he asked that there be no farewell ceremony for his body and no memorial meeting, and that his ashes be scattered over the Dabie Mountains, the Daba Mountains, the Taihang Mountains and the Hexi Corridor. At the request of Jiang Zemin, a farewell ceremony was held at Babaoshan, and his ashes were later scattered in the four places he had named. His official obituary described him as "an outstanding Communist, a great proletarian revolutionary, a strategist, and one of the founders of the Chinese People's Liberation Army".

== Legacy ==
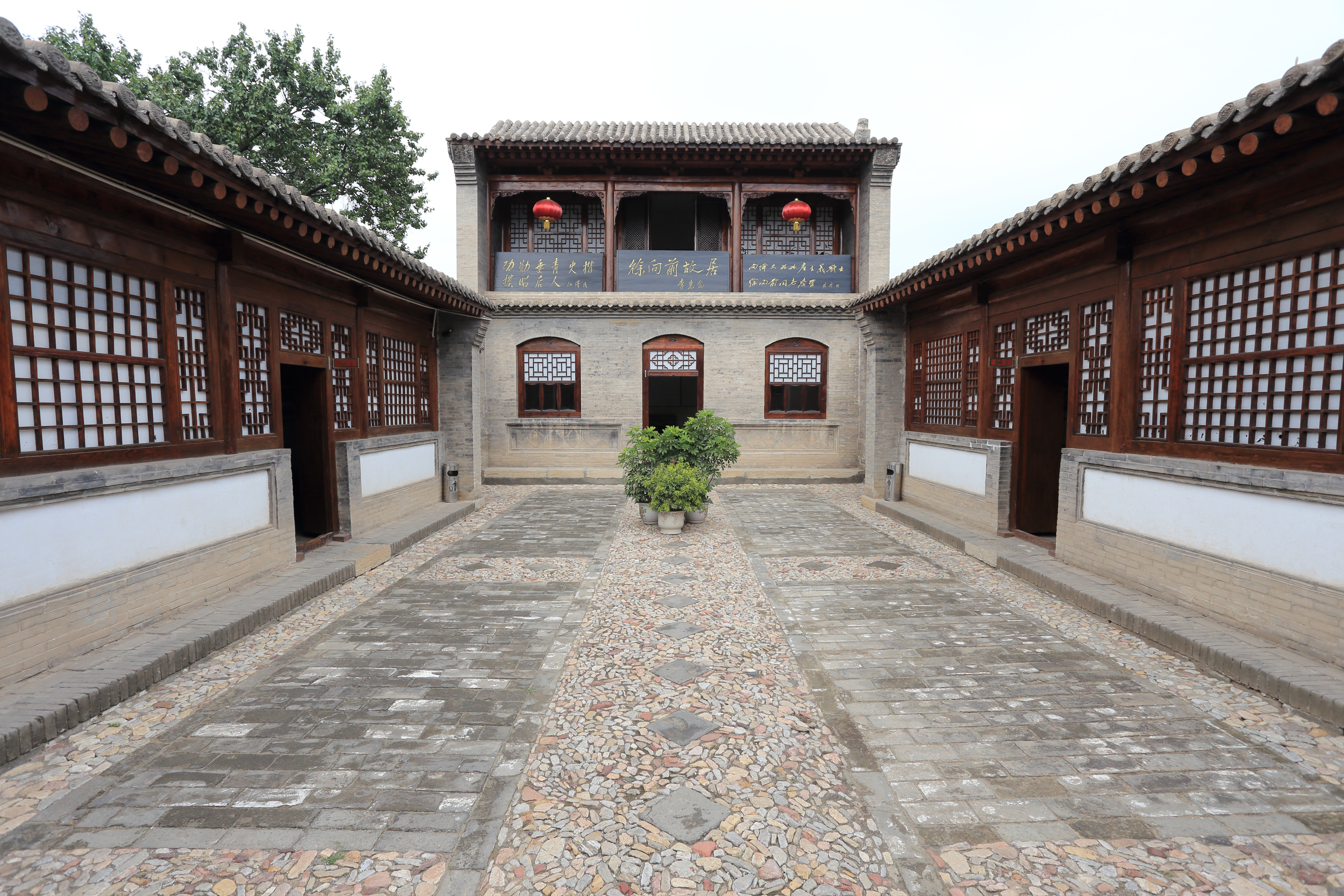
The former residence of Xu Xiangqian in Wutai County

Former president of China Li Xiannian, who had served under Xu in the Fourth Front Army, said that he had had two teachers in his life, Xu, who taught him to fight, and Chen Yun, who taught him to manage the economy. Xu's former residence in Yong'an village has been restored and opened to the public as a museum.

== Awards ==
Order of the Red Flag of the Chinese Soviet Republic (1931)
Red Star Medal of the Chinese Soviet Republic, First Class (1935)

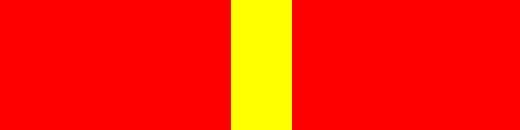
Order of 1 August (1st Class Medal) (1955)
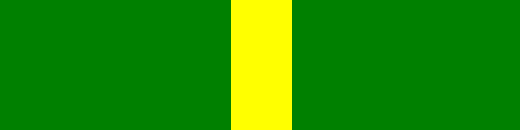
Order of Independence and Freedom (1st Class Medal) (1955)
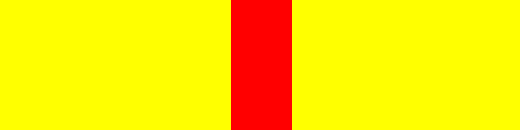
Order of Liberation (1st Class Medal) (1955)

== Personal life ==
Xu married four times. His first marriage, arranged by his parents, was to Zhu Xiangchan, who bore a daughter, Xu Songzhi, and died soon afterwards. His second wife, Cheng Xunxuan, whom he married in the Eyuwan Soviet, was secretly killed in Zhang Guotao's purge. On 20 September 1939, in Shandong, he married Wang Jing, a local party official, but they later divorced. In May 1946, he married Huang Jie.

Xu had three daughters and a son. Xu Songzhi, his daughter by his first wife, became an army doctor, Xu Luxi was his daughter by Wang Jing, and Xu Xiaotao and Xu Xiaoyan were his children by Huang Jie. Xu Xiaoyan became deputy director of the Science and Technology Commission of the General Armaments Department, and he was promoted to lieutenant general in 2006.

== Works ==
- Xu, Xiangqian (1987). 历史的回顾 [A Look Back at History] (in Chinese). Beijing: People's Liberation Army Publishing House.
- Xu, Xiangqian (1993). 徐向前军事文选 [Selected Military Writings of Xu Xiangqian] (in Chinese). Beijing: People's Liberation Army Publishing House.

== See also ==
- List of officers of the People's Liberation Army

Government offices
Preceded by Marshal Ye Jianying	Minister of National Defense of the PRC; 1978−1981	Succeeded by Geng Biao
Military offices
New title	Chief of the General Staff of the CPG People's Revolutionary Military Commission; 1949−1950	Next: Marshal Nie Rongzhen as Acting Chief of the General Staff
