= Nie Rongzhen =

Chinese military leader

Yuanshuai Nie Rongzhen
- 聂荣臻
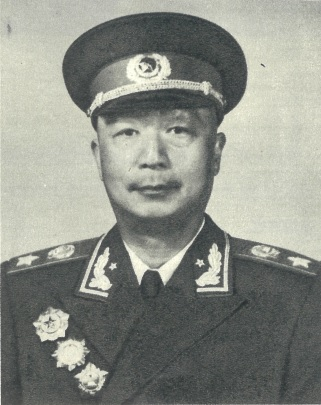
- Marshal Nie Rongzhen in 1955

Personal details
- Born: 聶榮臻; December 29, 1899 Jiangjin, Sichuan, Qing China (now Chongqing)
- Died: May 14, 1992 (aged 92) Beijing, China
- Party: Chinese Communist Party (joined in 1923)
- Occupation: General; military instructor; politician; writer

Military service
- Allegiance: Republic of China; China
- Branch/service: People's Liberation Army Ground Force
- Years of service: 1923–1987
- Rank: Marshal of the People's Republic of China
- Commands: Commander, 115th Division, Eighth Route Army; Commander, Northern China Military Region Field Army
- Battles/wars: Northern Expedition; Chinese Civil War; Long March; Zhengtai Campaign; Sino-Japanese War; Hundred Regiments Offensive

Chinese name
- Simplified Chinese: 聂荣臻
- Traditional Chinese: 聶榮臻
Transcriptions
Standard Mandarin
- Hanyu Pinyin: Niè Róngzhēn
- Wade–Giles: Nieh Jung-chen

Nie Rongzhen (Chinese: 聂荣臻; pinyin: Niè Róngzhēn; Wade–Giles: Nieh Jung-chen; December 29, 1899 – May 14, 1992) was a Chinese military leader and politician who served as a Marshal of the People's Republic of China. He was the last surviving officer among the original ten Marshals of the People's Liberation Army (PLA). An early participant in the Chinese Communist Party (CCP), Nie received military training in the Soviet Union and served as a political instructor at the Whampoa Military Academy. He participated in the Nanchang Uprising and the Guangzhou Uprising, and later played a vital role in leading troops during the Long March.

During the Second Sino-Japanese War, Nie served as commander of the 115th Division of the Eighth Route Army and established the Jin-Cha-Ji (Shanxi–Hebei–Chahar) anti-Japanese guerrilla base area. During the Chinese Civil War, he commanded the Northern China Military Region Field Army, orchestrating major operations in North China and contributing to the success of the Pingjin campaign. Following the founding of the People's Republic of China in 1949, Nie served as Mayor of Beijing, Acting Chief of the General Staff of the PLA during the Korean War, and Vice Premier of China. As Director of the State Science and Technology Commission and Chairman of the Defense Science and Technology Commission, he played a pivotal role in directing China's military modernization, including its strategic nuclear and missile development programs (known as "Two Bombs, One Satellite"). Re-emerging politically after the Cultural Revolution, he served as Vice Chairman of the Central Military Commission until his retirement in 1987.

== Early life ==
Nie Rongzhen was born on 29 December 1899 in Jiangjin County (now Jiangjin District of Chongqing), Sichuan. His father was Nie Shixian, and his mother was Tang Yushan. At the age of eight, he began three years of study at a private school run by his maternal grandfather, and in 1917, he entered Jiangjin Middle School. There he read works on evolution by Charles Darwin and Thomas Henry Huxley and the magazine New Youth. He took part in local student protests during the May Fourth Movement of 1919, and after the school came under pressure from the military and police and he could not continue his studies, he decided to go to France on the work–study programme.

On 9 December 1919, Nie sailed from Shanghai, and on 14 January 1920, he arrived in Marseille. He studied French at a school in Montargis, where he met Cai Hesen, Cai Chang, Xiang Jingyu, Chen Yi and Deng Xiaoping, who became a lifelong friend. When his savings ran out that winter, he worked as a tyre inspector, fitter, turner and coking worker at factories including the Hutchinson rubber works in Montargis, the Schneider steelworks at Le Creusot, Renault and Siemens. In 1921, after the Sino-French Education Association stopped funding the students and the Beiyang government ordered them home, he joined about 400 students in a petition at the Chinese legation in Paris on 28 February, which the French police broke up. In August 1921, he travelled from Le Creusot to Paris to join the protests against a French loan negotiated by the Beiyang government's envoy, Zhu Qiqian.

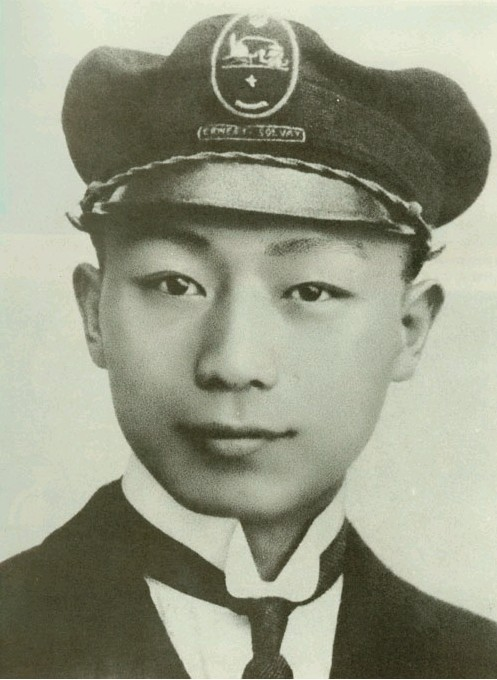
Nie during his time in Belgium (1922)

In late November 1921, Nie left France to study chemical engineering at the Université du Travail in Charleroi, Belgium, where he turned to Marxism. In June 1922, on the recommendation of Liu Bojian and Xiong Weigeng, he joined the Chinese Communist Youth Party in Europe, and in the spring of 1923, on the recommendation of Zhao Shiyan and Liu Bojian, he joined the Chinese Communist Party (CCP). That summer, he moved to Paris as a member of the executive committee of the Socialist Youth League in Europe. He also joined the Kuomintang (KMT) as an individual and headed its Paris liaison office. In the autumn of 1924, he went to Moscow to study at the Communist University of the Toilers of the East, and he later transferred to the Chinese class of the Institute of Red Professors.

In September 1925, Nie returned to China and became secretary of the political department and a political instructor at the Whampoa Military Academy. On 24 October 1925, he published an article on the importance of political work in the army in the academy's journal, Huangpu Chao. After the Zhongshan Warship Incident of 1926, he was dismissed from the academy and became a special commissioner of the military department of the CCP's Guangdong Regional Committee. During the Northern Expedition, he was secretary of the military committee of the CCP's Hubei Provincial Committee and helped the party's central military department to place Communists in the Northern Expedition army. After the Shanghai massacre of April 1927, he was sent to Shanghai to help Zhou Enlai reorganize the workers' pickets.

== Chinese Civil War (1927–1937) ==
In July 1927, Nie became secretary of the party's military committee at the front and went to Jiujiang to prepare an armed uprising. During the Nanchang uprising of August 1927, he led more than two regiments of the 25th Division of Zhang Fakui's army to join the revolt, and he then became party representative of the 11th Army under its commander, Ye Ting. After the insurgents were defeated in the Chaoshan region, he and Ye Ting escorted the ailing Zhou Enlai to Hong Kong. In December 1927, he returned secretly to Guangzhou to help lead the Guangzhou Uprising, and after it failed, he and Ye Ting ordered the retreat. In 1928, he became secretary of the military committee of the CCP's Guangdong Provincial Committee. In early 1930, he became head of the organization department of the party's Shunzhi Provincial Committee, and in May 1930, he moved to Shanghai to do underground work in the party's Special Services Section. In 1931, he became chief of staff of the party's Central Military Commission.

After the defection of Gu Shunzhang in April 1931 forced the party leadership to leave Shanghai, Nie moved to the Jiangxi Soviet in December 1931, where he became deputy director of the General Political Department of the Chinese Red Army. In March 1932, he became political commissar of the 1st Army Group, alongside its commander, Lin Biao, and he supported Mao Zedong's view that the Red Army should expand into areas where the Nationalist government was weak. In April, as political commissar of the Eastern Route Army, he helped to direct the capture of Zhangzhou. In February 1933, during the fourth encirclement campaign, he and Lin led the 1st Army Group to victories at Huangpi and Caotaigang, which, according to Chinese Communist accounts, destroyed 28,000 Nationalist troops. In August, they destroyed the Nationalist 80th Division at Wujiangxu. During the fifth encirclement campaign, the Red Army fought positional battles under the tactics of the Comintern adviser Otto Braun and suffered repeated defeats because it lacked heavy weapons. From 31 August to 3 September 1934, Nie and Lin used mobile warfare to win a battle at Wenfang, but it did not change the course of the campaign.

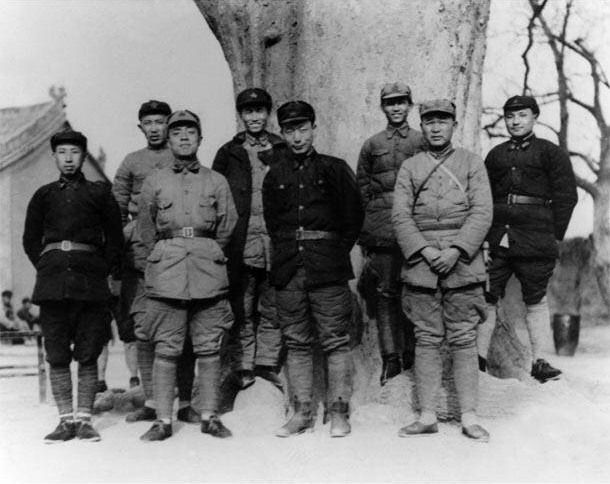
Nie (center) with other Red Army leaders (1936)

In October 1934, Nie set out on the Long March. He and Lin led the vanguard of the 1st Army Group, which broke through the first three Nationalist blockade lines, and in December, he took part in the Battle of Xiang River. At the Zunyi Conference in January 1935, he supported Mao. In May 1935, as political commissar of the advance force under Liu Bocheng, he led it through the Yi areas of the Daliang Mountains, organized the crossing of the Dadu River at Anshunchang and advanced up the river's east bank in support of the capture of Luding Bridge. After the 1st Army Group met the Fourth Front Army at Maogong in June 1935, he opposed Zhang Guotao and supported Mao's plan to move north. In October 1935, he and Lin led the vanguard into Wuqi, in northern Shaanxi, ending the Long March. In February 1936, they led the 1st Army Group across the Yellow River to attack the forces of Yan Xishan in Shanxi, destroying about seven regiments and taking more than 4,000 prisoners, according to Chinese Communist accounts. He then took part in the Western Expedition and the Battle of Shanchengbao.

== Second Sino-Japanese War ==
In August 1937, Nie became deputy commander of the 115th Division of the Eighth Route Army, with the rank of major general in the National Revolutionary Army. In September 1937, he and Lin Biao directed the Battle of Pingxingguan, in which, according to Chinese accounts, more than 1,000 men of Seishirō Itagaki's division were killed. In November 1937, he became commander and political commissar of the Shanxi–Chahar–Hebei Military Region and, with 3,000 men, established a base area around Mount Wutai. He extended it into central and eastern Hebei and the areas west and north of Beijing.

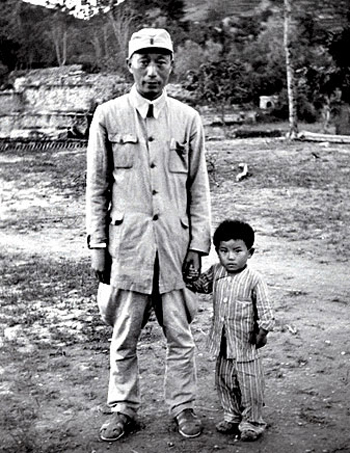
Nie with Japanese orphan Mihoko whom he had rescued following the Hundred Regiments Offensive (1940)

During the Japanese winter offensive against the base area in the autumn of 1939, Nie's forces killed or wounded more than 1,500 Japanese troops at Yansuya, and at the Battle of Huangtuling, troops under Nie and Yang Chengwu killed Lieutenant General Norihide Abe. In the spring of 1940, he led a column south to fight the Nationalist forces of Zhu Huaibing in south-eastern Shanxi. During the Hundred Regiments Offensive in August 1940, his troops attacked the Zhengtai, Tianjin–Pukou, Beiping–Hankou and Beining railways and paralysed Japanese transport in the region. During the offensive, on 20 August, his troops found two Japanese girls, four-year-old Mihoko Katō and her one-year-old sister Rumiko, near the Jingxing coal mine; their parents had been killed in the fighting. Nie had the girls returned to the Japanese with a letter he wrote to the Japanese commanders. Rumiko died soon afterwards, but Mihoko survived.

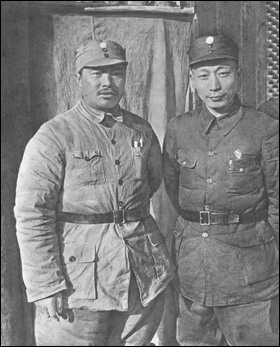
Nie with He Long (1939)

In the autumn of 1941, when the Japanese attacked the area where the base's headquarters were located, Nie moved his main force outside the encirclement to strike the Japanese and led the party and government offices through the mountains to safety. After a Japanese mopping-up operation in May 1942 reduced the base area, he called for advancing "to the enemy's rear behind the enemy's rear" and formed armed work teams to raid Japanese-held areas. In August 1943, he went to Yan'an for the Rectification Movement, and in 1945, he was elected to the Central Committee at the 7th Party Congress. On 10 August 1945, he, Xiao Ke and Liu Lantao ordered their troops to advance on Beiping and Tianjin and sent a force under Li Yunchang into Liaoning.

== Chinese Civil War (1945–1949) ==
In September 1945, Nie returned to Shanxi–Chahar–Hebei as secretary of the CCP's Central Bureau there and commander and political commissar of the military region. In October, he and He Long led an offensive against the forces of Fu Zuoyi in Suiyuan. After the ceasefire of 10 January 1946, he oversaw the demobilization of many of his troops, which, according to his subordinate Zheng Weishan, weakened them in later fighting. After full-scale civil war broke out in June 1946, Nie launched the Datong–Jining campaign in August, which failed after Fu Zuoyi relieved Datong and Nie misjudged the situation. Nationalist forces then took Zhangjiakou, the capital of the border region. At a meeting in Laiyuan on 22 October, Nie argued that the destruction of Nationalist forces, rather than the holding of territory, should be the main objective.

In April 1947, Nie directed the Zhengtai campaign, which, according to Chinese Communist accounts, destroyed more than 35,000 Nationalist troops and linked his base area with the Shanxi–Hebei–Shandong–Henan base area. In November 1947, after a victory at Qingfengdian, his forces took Shijiazhuang, the first large city the Communist forces captured by assault. In January 1948, in the Laishui campaign, they destroyed a division of Fu Zuoyi's army, and the commander of Fu's 35th Army, Lu Yinglin, killed himself.

In May 1948, after the party leadership arrived at Xibaipo, the Shanxi–Chahar–Hebei and Shanxi–Hebei–Shandong–Henan military regions were merged into the North China Military Region, with Nie as commander and third secretary of the party's North China Bureau. His forces cut the links between the Nationalist armies in the north-east and north China, and they attacked along the Beiping–Hankou and Beiping–Suiyuan railways to support the Liaoshen campaign. When the Pingjin campaign began in December 1948, he, Lin Biao and Luo Ronghuan formed its General Front Committee, which directed both the Northeast Field Army and the North China forces. After the Battle of Xinbao'an, he proposed to Mao that Beiping be taken peacefully, and Mao agreed. After Tianjin fell, Nie, Lin and others negotiated Beiping's surrender with Fu Zuoyi. In January 1949, after Beiping's peaceful surrender, Nie became commander of the Beiping–Tianjin Garrison and then mayor of Beiping and head of its military control commission, responsible for restoring public order, suppressing bandits and reorganizing Fu's troops. In June 1949, he became deputy chief of the General Staff.

== People's Republic of China ==
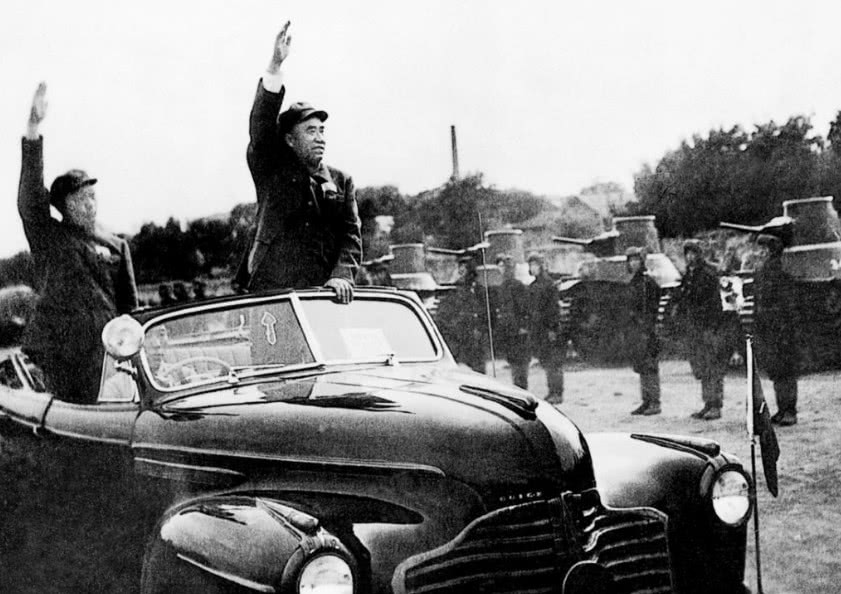
Nie and Zhu De inspecting troops at the founding ceremony of People's Republic of China (1 October 1949)

On 1 October 1949, Nie commanded the military parade at the founding ceremony of the People's Republic, accompanying Zhu De as he reviewed the troops, and in November, he was elected mayor of Beijing. He became acting chief of the General Staff in early 1950, and he oversaw the development of the army's specialized arms, its modernization and a large reduction in its size. After the Korean War began, he was responsible for planning the operations of the People's Volunteer Army. In the autumn of 1952, he collapsed in his office from overwork. In February 1953, he became chairman of the committee responsible for introducing military ranks, but from March, he was convalescing in Nanjing and Hangzhou.

Nie speaking at the 1st National Committee of the Chinese People's Political Consultative Conference (1950)

In 1954, Nie took charge of military industry and equipment as a vice-chairman of the military commission. In July 1955, he, Chen Yun and Bo Yibo formed a three-man group to prepare the atomic energy industry, and in September, he was made a Marshal of the People's Republic of China. In March 1956, he became one of the leaders of the Scientific Planning Commission set up by the State Council, and in May, he proposed the creation of a missile research programme. In September, he was elected to the Central Committee at the 8th Party Congress. He helped to draw up the Twelve-Year Science Plan in October, and in November, he became a Vice Premier, succeeding Chen Yi in charge of science and technology. In September 1957, he led a government industrial delegation to the Soviet Union, including Chen Geng, Song Renqiong and Qian Xuesen, and on 15 October, he and the Soviet first deputy premier, Mikhail Pervukhin, signed the New Defence Technical Accord.

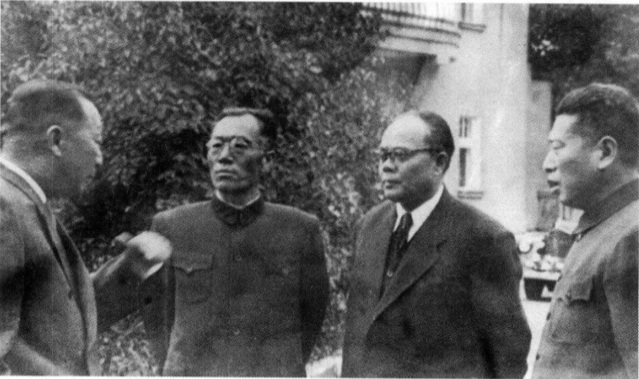
Nie (left) with members of Chinese delegation at the Chinese embassy in the Soviet Union (1957)

In February 1958, Nie was put in overall charge of building missile and nuclear test ranges. In June, when Mao set up party groups for finance, legal affairs, foreign affairs, science, and culture and education that bypassed the State Council, Nie became head of the science group. In October 1958, he became director of the new National Defence Science and Technology Commission (NDSTC), which oversaw the Second Ministry of Machine Building, the Lop Nur nuclear test base and the Defence Ministry's Fifth Academy, which developed missiles. He also became chairman of the State Science and Technology Commission, directing research on missiles, atomic bombs and satellites. As director of the NDSTC, he set out China's doctrine of minimum deterrence, arguing that China "must develop advanced weapons, missiles and atomic bombs, so that we have the minimum means of reprisal" if attacked with nuclear weapons, and that "[w]ithout nuclear missiles, we cannot break the nuclear blackmail of the imperialists".

In September 1959, he became a vice-chairman of the Central Military Commission, with responsibility for advanced weapons. When the Soviet Union withdrew its experts and aid in the early 1960s, during the economic crisis that followed the Great Leap Forward, he twice urged the party leadership to press on with the "Two Bombs, One Satellite" programmes, relying mainly on China's own efforts. In April 1961, he oversaw the drafting of the "Fourteen Articles" on scientific work, which described intellectuals as members of the working class, called on party members to respect the views of scientists outside the party and said that scientists should be able to devote five-sixths of their time to research. In November 1962, he became a member of the fifteen-member Central Special Committee, chaired by Zhou Enlai, which oversaw the advanced weapons programmes. China launched its first domestically developed medium-range missile in June 1964 and tested its first atomic bomb on 16 October 1964. Nie later directed three major nuclear tests on site: the first test of a missile carrying a live nuclear warhead in October 1966, a test of the hydrogen bomb principle in December 1966 and the first air-dropped hydrogen bomb test in June 1967.

== Cultural Revolution ==
In August 1966, at the start of the Cultural Revolution, Nie was elected to the Politburo. At meetings of the Central Military Commission at the Jingxi Hotel in January 1967, he, Xu Xiangqian and Ye Jianying clashed with Jiang Qing, Chen Boda, Kang Sheng and Yao Wenyuan over whether the Cultural Revolution should be extended to the army. On 24 January, Nie, Ye and Xu met Lin Biao and drew up regulations to keep the army stable, which Mao approved on 28 January as the "Eight Articles". On 16 February 1967, Nie, Tan Zhenlin, Chen Yi and Li Xiannian denounced the Central Cultural Revolution Group at a meeting. After Mao sided with the group, they were condemned for the "February Countercurrent", and from March, Nie was criticized at seven "political life meetings". In March 1968, after the purge of Yang Chengwu, Yu Lijin and Fu Chongbi, Chen Boda and Kang Sheng tried to implicate Nie as their "black backer". He was criticized again at the 12th Plenary Session of the 8th Central Committee in October 1968 and at the 9th Party Congress in April 1969.

In February 1969, Nie was sent to work at the Third Chemical Plant. Later that year, he was forced to resign from the NDSTC, although the Australian journalist Francis James, who had spoken to staff at a gaseous diffusion plant near Lanzhou, reported in 1969 that China's entire nuclear weapons programme was under Nie's authority. In October 1969, under Lin Biao's "Order No. 1", senior commanders were evacuated from Beijing, and Nie was sent to Handan. He returned to Beijing for treatment of eczema in February 1970. In 1971, after the North China Conference removed Li Xuefeng and Zheng Weishan from their posts, Jiang Qing denounced Nie as the "black backer" of factionalism in north China. After the Lin Biao incident of September 1971 and Chen Yi's death in January 1972, Mao rehabilitated those condemned for the February Countercurrent. In January 1975, Nie was elected a vice-chairman of the Standing Committee of the National People's Congress. In September 1976, after Mao's death, he sent word to Ye Jianying through Yang Chengwu that extraordinary measures would be needed to deal with the Gang of Four, who were arrested on 6 October in smashing the Gang of Four led by Hua Guofeng, Ye Jianying and Wang Dongxing.

== Later life and death ==
In August 1977, Nie was reappointed a vice-chairman of the Central Military Commission. During the debate over the "Two Whatevers", he argued in an article in Red Flag on 5 September 1977 that "seeking truth from facts" was the most important part of Mao's theoretical legacy. In 1978 and 1979, he stressed the doctrine of people's war, self-reliance in modernizing weapons and a smaller, better-trained army. At meetings of the Central Special Committee in those years, he proposed cancelling the Hurricane-1 tactical nuclear weapon as inconsistent with China's defensive policy and its principle of no first use, and the proposal was accepted. In July 1980, Mihoko, the Japanese girl he had rescued in 1940, visited him in Beijing with her family. He left the Central Committee in September 1985 and retired from the Central Military Commission at the 13th Party Congress in 1987. After the death of Hu Yaobang in April 1989, Nie wrote to Hu's widow, Li Zhao, praising Hu's political work in the north China armies during the civil war, and he attended Hu's memorial service in a wheelchair. During the Tiananmen Square protests of 1989, he and Marshal Xu Xiangqian, published statements which, while calling for civil order, warned that the PLA should not resort to bloodshed to suppress the protests. In January 1990, he and Xu called on former Whampoa teachers and students to work for the peaceful reunification of China and Taiwan.

On 12 April 1992, Nie dictated a final statement to his daughter and two secretaries, in which he endorsed reform and opening up and Deng Xiaoping's southern tour and expressed hope for reunification with Taiwan. He died of heart failure in Beijing on 14 May 1992, aged 92, the last of the ten marshals to die. He was cremated at Babaoshan Revolutionary Cemetery on 28 May. In accordance with his wishes, part of his ashes was scattered under a juniper tree at Babaoshan, beside a tablet inscribed with lines from a poem he wrote at the age of 80, and the rest was buried in the martyrs' cemetery of the Jiuquan Satellite Launch Center.

== Honours ==
Order of the Red Flag of the Chinese Soviet Republic (1931)
Red Star Medal of the Chinese Soviet Republic (2nd Class Medal) (1933)
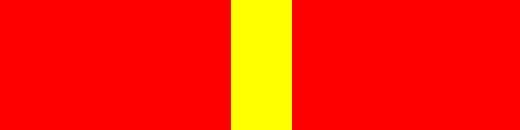
Order of 1 August (1st Class Medal) (1955)
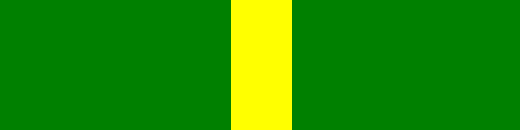
Order of Independence and Freedom (1st Class Medal) (1955)
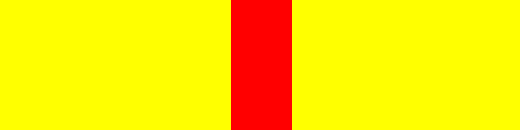
Order of Liberation (1st Class Medal) (1955)
Red Star Medal of Honour (1st Class Medal) (1988)

At his family's request, Jiang Zemin wrote the inscription "Comrade Nie Rongzhen will always be with us". In 1999, a memorial museum to Nie opened in Jiangjin, and his former residence in Wutan was listed as a Major Historical and Cultural Site Protected at the National Level in 2013. The Chongqing Nie Rongzhen Research Society, founded in 1997, is based at the museum. In November 1999, Jiangjin and Mihoko's birthplace, Miyakonojō, became sister cities. In December 2013, CCTV broadcast a television series based on his daughter's memoir of him.

== Personal life ==
In 1915, Nie entered an arranged marriage with Long Shengxian. They lived together for four years before he left for France and had no children. After joining the CCP, he cut off contact with his family to protect them. When she died on 12 May 1988, he sent a wreath in the name of his family. In 1928, while working underground in Hong Kong, he married Zhang Ruihua, a party courier, who later worked in the Central Organization Department and died in 1995. Their daughter, Nie Li, became a lieutenant general and deputy director of the science and technology committee of the Commission for Science, Technology and Industry for National Defense; her husband, General Ding Henggao, directed the commission.

== Works ==
- Memoirs of Nie Rongzhen (聂荣臻回忆录). 3 vols. PLA Publishing House, 1983.
- Selected Military Writings of Nie Rongzhen (聂荣臻军事文选). PLA Publishing House, 1992.
- Selected Writings on Science and Technology of Nie Rongzhen (聂荣臻科技文选). National Defense Industry Press, 1999.

== In popular culture ==
- The Founding of a Republic (2009)
- Our French Years (2012)
- Nie Rongzhen (2013), a television series
- The Founding of an Army (2017), in which Nie is played by Shi Xiaolong

Government offices
Preceded by Ye Jianying	Mayor of Beijing; 1949–1951	Succeeded by Peng Zhen
New title	Director of State Science and Technology Commission; 1958–1970	Next: Fang Yi
Military offices
Preceded by Xu Xiangqian	Chief of the General Staff of the CPG People's Revolutionary Military Commission (acting); 1950–1954	Succeeded by Su Yu as the Chief of the General Staff of the PLA
