= Xu Xiaoyan =

Xu Xiaoyan may refer to:

- Xu Xiaoyan (general)
- Xu Xiaoyan (rugby union)
