= Xiao Yedan =

Yi chieftain (1894–1942)

- 小叶丹
- Statue of Xiao Yedan
- Born: Guoji Yueda (果基约达); 1894; Mianning County, Sichuan, Qing China
- Died: 18 June 1942 (aged 47–48); Mianning County, Xikang, Republic of China
- Cause of death: Murder
- Occupation: Chieftain of the Sat branch of the Guoji clan of Yi people

Xiao Yedan (Chinese: 小叶丹; 1894 – 18 June 1942) was a Chinese Yi chieftain based in Sichuan. In May 1935, when a detachment of the Chinese Red Army led by Liu Bocheng entered the Yi ethnic area in Liangshan, Sichuan, Xiao met with Liu and swore a blood oath with him in accordance with Yi customs, forming the Yi-Hai Alliance among the Yi people and the Red Army.

== Early life ==
Born in 1894 in Mianning County as Guoji Yueda to ethnic Yi family, he was the fourth of six brothers. When he became chieftain of the Sat branch of the Guoji clan of Yi people, he was younger than other heads of the Yi family branches and hence he was called Xiao Yedan, which means younger Yedan. The Guoji clan is one of the largest Yi clans in the Liangshan. As an influential Yi leader, Xiao often used Yi proverbs to educate the youth within the clan such as "cut trees that grow upwards, drink water that flows downwards, and walk on flat paths." He compiled a set of instructional phrases similar to the Three Character Classic, admonishing his clansmen to avoid unjust actions, and held considerable prestige and influence in Mianning.

== Chieftain ==
In 1934, the Chinese Red Army and Chinese Communist Party began a military retreat from advancing Kuomintang forces during the Chinese Civil War. Known as the Long March, about 100,000 troops retreated from the Jiangxi Soviet and other bases to a new headquarters in Yan'an, Shaanxi, traversing some 10,000 kilometres (6,000 miles). In May 1935, the Central Red Army led by Liu Bocheng crossed the Jinsha River to the north and found itself encircled by the Kuomintang forces. They needed to traverse the Daliang Mountains and cross the Dadu River to break through the encirclement. In order to do so, the vanguard of the Central Red Army advanced into the Yi ethnic region in Daliangshan on 22 May. From there, they faced resistance from the Yi people, who seized their supplies and even launched armed attacks, creating a desperate situation. The Central Red Army set up a defensive position and used interpreters who understood the Yi language to communicate and explain their intentions to the Yi community. Xiao Yedan, the Yi chieftain, expressed his willingness to talk with the Red Army after learning about their situation. After the Red Army explained their situation to him, and with the promise to overthrow the warlords and to treat everyone as equals led to Xiao to agree to have negotiations with Liu Bocheng.

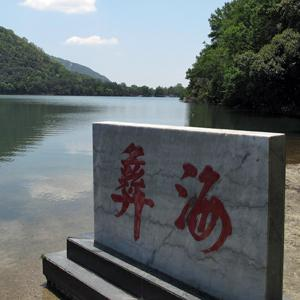
Marker marking the location of the Yi-Hai Alliance

At the negotiations, Liu explained the Red Army's mission of marching north to resist Japanese aggression and the Party's policy of ethnic equality. Afterwards, Xiao proposed forming a brotherhood with Liu. On 22 May 1935, at a small valley within the Hengduan Mountains, a brotherhood ceremony was held where Liu and Xiao drank chicken blood mixed with water to formally establish the alliance, now known as the Yi-Hai Alliance. Subsequently, Xiao Yedan and his followers were warmly received by the Red Army and were granted a flag reading 'China People's Red Army Guoji Detachment', marking the official establishment of the Chinese Red Army's Yi detachment.

On 23 May, Xiao Yedan's fourth uncle guided the Red Army's troops through the Yi ethnic region. Xiao Yedan then led the main force of the Central Red Army into the area, where they were received by the local Yi people. With the assistance of the Yi people, the Central Red Army successfully passed through the region. In response to the Yi people allowing Red Army soldiers to pass through their territory, a Kuomintang affiliated local warlord retaliated against the Guoji branch of Yi people by executing three leaders of the branch and ordering them to hand over all guns and fined them 12,000 taels of silver.

On 18 June 1942, Xiao Yedan was invited to attend a wedding banquet. While on the way to banquet, he passed through the territory belonging to a rival Yi clan. Upon seeing the rival clan's women working in the fields, he fired his gun at them, resulting in a pursuit against Xiao Yedan by the rival clan. In the end, he was shot and killed by them on the streets of Daqiao Town in Mianning County. His murder was seen as a result of a long-standing feud between the Yi clans but the official historiography of Xiao Yedan by the Chinese Communist Party alleges that the rival clan were bribed by the Kuomintang to murder him as a result of the Yi-Hai Alliance.

== Legacy ==
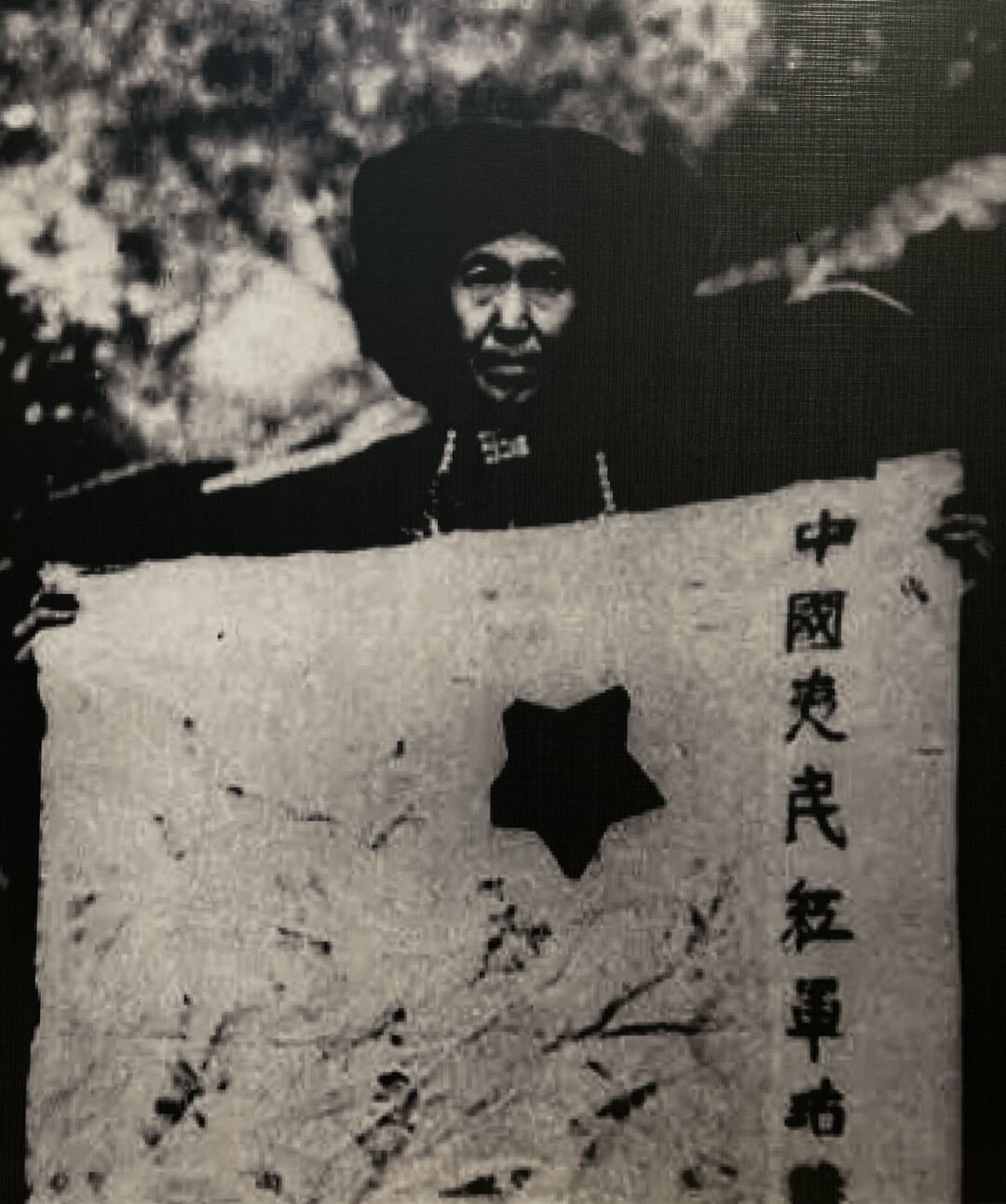
Wife of Xiao Yedan holding the flag of the Chinese Red Army's Yi detachment

Following the establishment of the People's Republic of China in 1949 and the capture of Xikang Province by the People's Liberation Army in 1950, Xiao Yedan's wife handed the flag of the Chinese Red Army's Yi detachment to the Chinese government. The flag is currently stored at the Military Museum of the Chinese People's Revolution in Beijing.

After the Yi-Hai Alliance, Xiao Yedan's home county, Mianning, formed the openly armed Mianning Anti-Tax Army under the leadership of the local Communist Party committee and established the Mianning Revolutionary Committee. A Red Army guerrilla unit also remained in the north of the county. After the main Red Army forces left, the guerrilla unit merged with the Anti-Tax Army, preparing to move north and re-join the main force. However, Yi armed groups attacked the Anti-Tax Army as it tried to pass through Yi territory, scattering the troops and killing most of the leaders, leading to the collapse of the Mianning Revolutionary Committee. Some members of Xiao Yedan's forces participated in the attack. Stragglers and wounded Red Army soldiers were captured and sold as slaves. Because of this, from the mid-1990s, some Party historians began to view Xiao Yedan negatively, considering his role in attacking the Anti-Tax Army as a betrayal of the revolution. This raised debates over how to assess his legacy and whether to continue promoting the Yi-Hai Alliance. Some publications even stopped mentioning it. For ethnic unity, the Sichuan Provincial Party Committee later decided that historical accounts should affirm Xiao Yedan's role and continue to highlight the Yi-Hai Alliance as a model of policy implementation on ethnic minorities.

A memorial hall honoring the Yi-Hai Alliance is located in Mianning County. A sculpture featuring Xiao Yedan and Liu Bocheng as part of honoring of the Yi-Hai Alliance is located in Xichang. In 2009, Xiao Yedan was named one of the 100 heroes and role models who contributed to the founding of New China.
