= Yuanshuai =

Chinese military rank that corresponds to a marshal in other nations

Yuánshuài (simplified Chinese: 元帅; traditional Chinese: 元帥; pinyin: Yuánshuài; lit. 'chief commander') is a Chinese military title that corresponds to a marshal in other nations. The term appears as an official title in the Zuo zhuan, and after the Northern and Southern dynasties, successive dynasties created a range of marshal titles for the commanders of their armies. The higher title of dayuanshuai (grand marshal) was held in the Republic of China by Sun Yat-sen, Zhang Zuolin and Chiang Kai-shek, among others. In the People's Republic of China, the rank of Marshal of the People's Republic of China was conferred on ten commanders of the People's Liberation Army in 1955 and abolished in 1965. The rank of Dayanshuai was created at the same time but never conferred, because Mao Zedong did not want it.

== History ==
=== Origins ===
The term yuanshuai appears as an official title in the Zuo zhuan, whose entry for the 27th year of Duke Xi of Lu records Duke Wen of Jin deliberating over the choice of a yuanshuai. After the Northern and Southern dynasties, successive dynasties created a range of related titles. These included marshal of all armies under heaven, grand marshal of armies, marshal of the expeditionary army, supreme marshal, marshal and vice marshal.

=== Imperial China ===
During the An Lushan rebellion, Emperor Suzong of the Tang dynasty appointed his son Li Chu, the Prince of Guangping, and the general Guo Ziyi as marshal and vice marshal of all armies under heaven. They led the main Tang army against the rebels, and with the help of Uyghur reinforcements they recaptured Chang'an and Luoyang. Li Chu later became emperor, and in 762 he made his eldest son Li Kuo, the Prince of Yong, marshal of all armies under heaven for a renewed assault on Luoyang.

At the end of the Northern Song, Zhao Gou, the Prince of Kang, used the title of grand marshal of all armies under heaven to rally resistance against the Jin. The Jurchen-led Jin dynasty had its own supreme marshal's office. Under Emperor Xizong, Wanyan Zongbi, better known as Wuzhu, was made supreme marshal while also heading the Branch Department of State Affairs. Based in Bianjing, Wuzhu held both military and civil authority, with military affairs decided by the marshal's office and civil matters such as lawsuits and revenue left to the branch department.

According to Ma Lei, writing in The Paper, the post of grand marshal was hardly ever created after the Ming dynasty, and the title became one that leaders of peasant uprisings gave themselves. It returned to the state system in the last years of the Qing dynasty. On 5 July 1909, an edict issued in the name of the Xuantong Emperor declared that the emperor would be grand marshal of the army and navy, with the regent Zaifeng acting in the role until the emperor came of age. Ma described Zaifeng as the first grand marshal in China's modern history.

=== Republic of China ===
On 4 December 1911, during the Xinhai Revolution, provincial representatives meeting in Shanghai chose Huang Xing as provisional grand marshal and Li Yuanhong as vice marshal, to command the revolutionary armies for the time being. After Huang declined, Li was named provisional grand marshal with Huang as his deputy, and the posts were dropped once Sun Yat-sen had been elected provisional president. The constitutional compact promulgated under Yuan Shikai in 1914 made the president grand marshal of the army and navy, in command of all the country's forces.

On 1 September 1917, the Extraordinary Parliament in Guangzhou elected Sun grand marshal of the military government, with Tang Jiyao and Lu Rongting as marshals. Tang and Lu both refused to take up the posts of marshal. On 21 February 1923, Sun returned to Guangzhou and again took office as grand marshal of the army and navy, with his own headquarters. On 18 June 1927, Zhang Zuolin took office in Beijing as grand marshal of the army and navy, after Sun Chuanfang, Zhang Zongchang and other northern commanders had declared their support for him.

Western writers called Chiang Kai-shek the "Generalissimo", a title often rendered in Chinese as Dayuanshuai. In 1937, during the Second Sino-Japanese War, the wartime headquarters named Chiang grand marshal of the army, navy and air force, which Ma described as the only formal use of the title under the Nationalist government. The headquarters was abolished in January 1938. Chiang had been made a special-class general in 1935.

=== People's Republic of China ===
Shoulder board of the 1955 marshal's uniform

In the People's Republic of China, regulations adopted by the Standing Committee of the National People's Congress on 8 February 1955 created the first rank system of the People's Liberation Army (PLA), with the ranks of grand marshal and marshal in its highest grade. A draft of 1953 had also provided for marshals of individual arms of service, but the 1955 regulations kept only the national ranks of grand marshal and marshal of the People's Republic of China. According to the scholar Liu Yan, the new rank drew on the Soviet rank system rather than continuing China's historical marshal titles. Grand marshal was never conferred, because Mao Zedong did not want the rank, so Marshal of the People's Republic of China became the highest rank ever awarded in the PLA. Mao also held that leaders working in civilian government should not receive military ranks, and Liu Shaoqi, Zhou Enlai and Deng Xiaoping stayed out of the evaluation of ranks. Chen Yi, who had become a vice premier in 1954, was made an exception at Zhou's suggestion.

On 27 September 1955, the rank was conferred on ten senior commanders at a ceremony in the Huairen Hall in Zhongnanhai. The ten marshals were Zhu De, Peng Dehuai, Lin Biao, Liu Bocheng, He Long, Chen Yi, Luo Ronghuan, Xu Xiangqian, Nie Rongzhen and Ye Jianying. The rank was abolished together with the PLA's rank system on 1 June 1965, and it was not restored when ranks were reintroduced in 1988.

== See also ==
- Marshal of the Soviet Union
- Other pronunciations of the Chinese characters 元帥
  - Gensui, the Japanese equivalent
  - Wonsu, the Korean equivalent
  - Nguyên soái, the Vietnamese equivalent
- Grand yuanshuai (大元帥), a rank higher than yuanshuai
  - Dayuanshuai in Chinese
  - Dai-gensui, the Japanese equivalent
  - Taewonsu, the Korean equivalent
  - Đại nguyên soái, the Vietnamese equivalent

== Bibliography ==
- Lee, Khoon Choy (2005). Pioneers of Modern China: Understanding the Inscrutable Chinese (Hardcover). World Scientific Pub. ISBN 9789812566188.
- Song, Yuwu (2014). Biographical Dictionary of the People's Republic of China (Hardcover). McFarland, Incorporated. ISBN 9781476602981.
- Wortzel, Larry M. (1999). Dictionary of Contemporary Chinese Military History (Hardcover). ABC-CLIO. ISBN 9781567509762.
