= Dai-gensui =

Highest rank in the Imperial Japanese Army and Navy

Dai-gensui 大元帥 (Japanese)
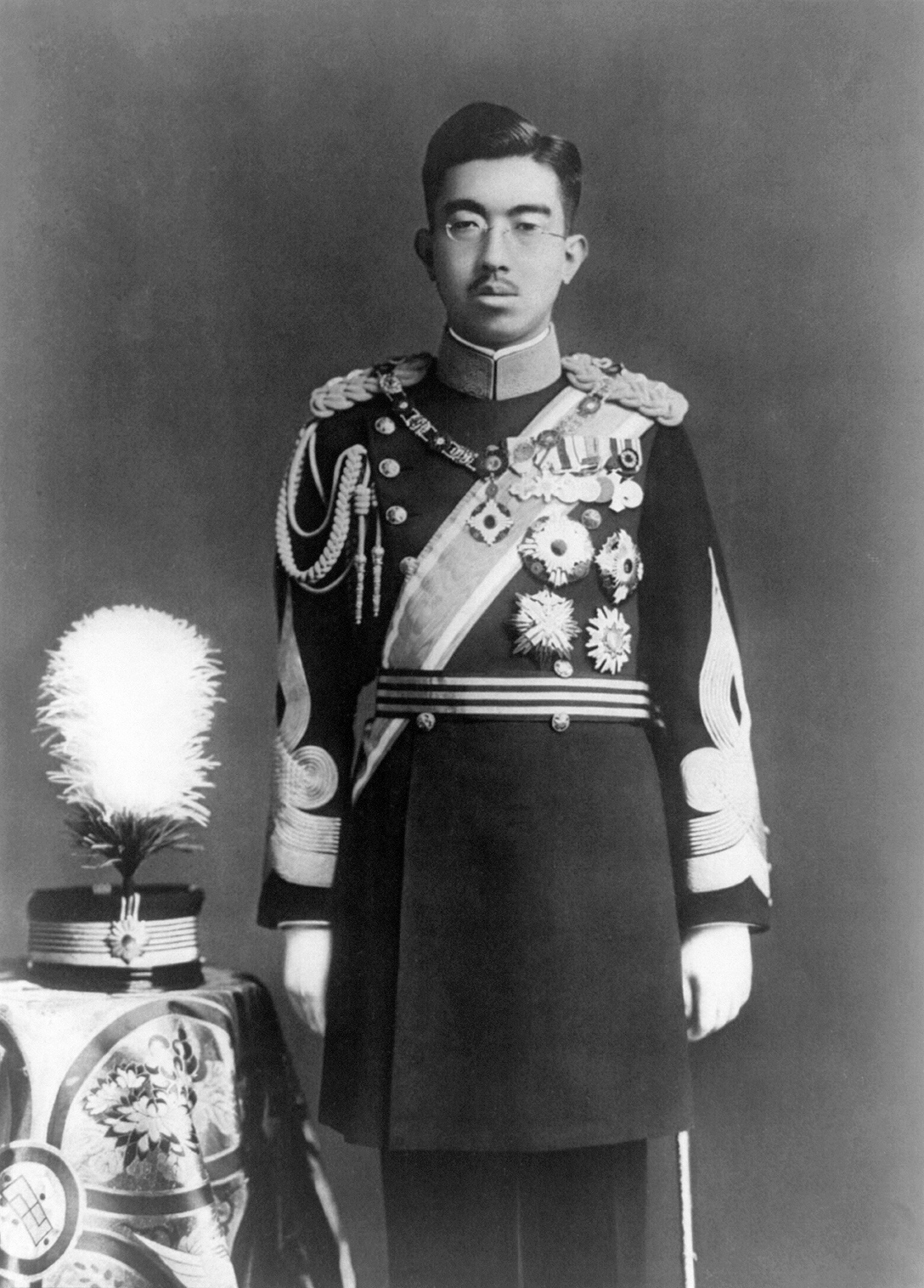
- The Shōwa Emperor in the dress uniform of a grand marshal (c. 1935)
- Country: Empire of Japan
- Service branch: Imperial Japanese Army; Imperial Japanese Navy
- Formation: 1872
- Abolished: 1947
- Next lower rank: Gensui (army and navy variant)

The Supreme Commander-in-chief of the Imperial Japanese Army and Navy (Japanese: 大元帥陸海軍大将, romanized: Dai-gensui-riku-kai-gun-taishō) was the highest rank of the Imperial Japanese Army and the Imperial Japanese Navy from 1872 to 1945, when the Empire of Japan was dissolved. The rank of dai-gensui was the highest rank in the Imperial Japanese Armed Forces and was held solely by the Emperor of Japan in his capacity as Supreme commander-in-chief. It formally became obsolete in 1945 when the Imperial Japanese military was abolished.

== History ==
The term originated from the Chinese military title da yuan shuai (大元帥), a title higher than yuan shuai (元帥, pronounced gensui in Japanese).

Decree No. 252 by the Dajokan, dated 7 September 1872, formally recognized the rank of dai-gensui; however, no appointments were made before the rank was abolished along with that of gensui on 8 May 1873. According to "Draft Ordinance No. 142" of the Constitution of the Empire of Japan (Chapter 1 Part 1) issued on 30 September 1889, the Emperor was officially granted the rank of dai-gensui and designated as supreme commander of the Army and Navy.

The kanji characters also refer to a Buddhist deity, Daigensui Myō'ō (大元帥明王), a Wisdom King worshipped by the Imperial Court since Emperor Ninmyō and by the Shingon sect, for its legendary miraculous power to quell foreign enemies and rebellions, much like a military leader.

== Insignia ==
The insignia for the rank of dai-gensui were similar to those of an Imperial Japanese Army General or Imperial Japanese Navy Admiral, distinguished by the addition of the gold imperial chrysanthemum emblem.

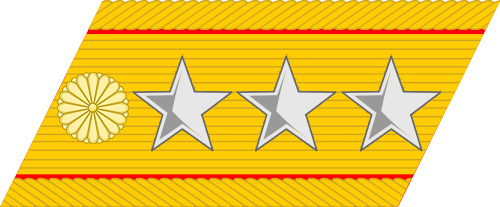
Army collar insignia

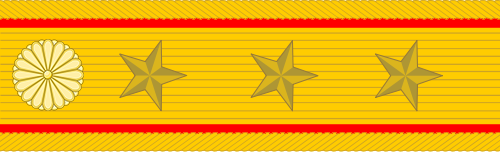
Army shoulder insignia

Naval shoulder insignia

Naval collar insignia

Naval sleeve insignia

Naval sleeve insignia

== List of holders ==
Portrait	Name (birth–death)	Term of office			Ref.
Portrait	Name (birth–death)	Took office	Left office	Time in office	Ref.
	Meiji Emperor (1852–1912)	1889	30 July 1912 †	23–24 years	
	Taishō Emperor (1879–1926)	30 July 1912	25 December 1926 †	13–14 years	
	Shōwa Emperor (1901–1989)	25 December 1926	2 September 1945	18–19 years	

== See also ==
- Other pronunciations of the characters 大元帥
  - Dayuanshuai in Chinese
  - Taewonsu, the Korean equivalent
- The higher rank of gensui (元帥)
  - Yuanshuai, the original Chinese title
  - Wonsu, the Korean equivalent
