= Xu Xiaoyan (general) =

Chinese general

- 徐小岩

Deputy Commander of Nanjing Military Region
- In office July 2005 – January 2006
- Commander: Zhu Wenquan

Head of Information Division of the People's Liberation Army General Staff Department
- In office December 1999 – July 2005
- Preceded by: Yuan Banggen
- Succeeded by: Zhang Xuncai

Personal details
- Born: February 1947 (age 79) Wutai County, Shanxi, China
- Party: Chinese Communist Party
- Parent(s): Xu Xiangqian; Huang Jie
- Education: Tsinghua University

Military service
- Allegiance: People's Republic of China
- Branch/service: People's Liberation Army Ground Force
- Years of service: 1968–2010
- Rank: Lieutenant general

Xu Xiaoyan (Chinese: 徐小岩; pinyin: Xú Xiǎoyán; born February 1947) is a retired lieutenant general (zhongjiang) in the People's Liberation Army. Previously he was Deputy Director of Science and Technology Committee of General Equipment Department of the People's Liberation Army. He was promoted to the rank of major general (shaojiang) in 1994 and lieutenant general (zhongjiang) in 2006.

== Early life and education ==
Xu was born in Wutai County, Shanxi in February 1947, to Xu Xiangqian, a Communist military officer, and Huang Jie. He secondary studied at Beijing No. 4 High School. In 1972 he was accepted to Tsinghua University, majoring in the Department of Computer, where he graduated in 1975. Then he pursued advanced studies in Canada.

== Career ==
He enlisted in the People's Liberation Army (PLA) in 1968. In December 1999 he became Head of Information Division of the People's Liberation Army General Staff Department, replacing Yuan Banggen. In July 2005 he was promoted to become Deputy Commander of Nanjing Military Region, but having held the position for only six months, and he was appointed Deputy Director of Science and Technology Committee of General Equipment Department of the People's Liberation Army.

He was a delegate to the 10th National People's Congress.

Military offices
| Preceded by Yuan Banggen | Head of Information Division of the People's Liberation Army General Staff Department; 1999–2005 | Succeeded by Zhang Xuncai |
