= Liu Bocheng =

Chinese Communist military commander (1892–1986)

Marshal Liu Bocheng
- 刘伯承
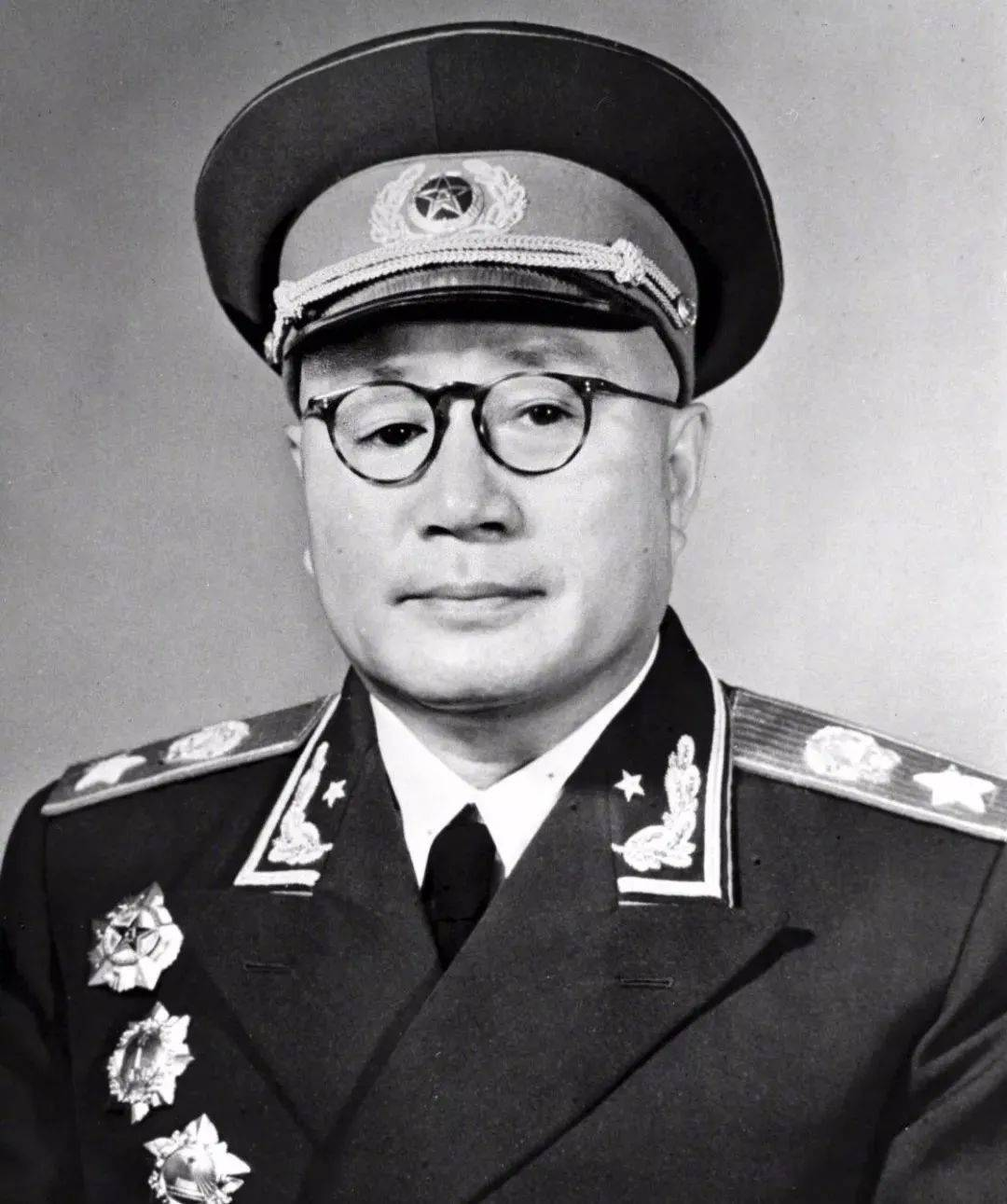
- Liu Bocheng in his Marshal uniform, 1955

Personal details
- Born: 4 December 1892 Kai County, China
- Died: 7 October 1986 (aged 93) Beijing, China
- Party: Chinese Communist Party
- Occupation: Politician, writer, military instructor
- Nickname(s): Chinese Mars, One-Eyed Dragon, the Kutuzov of China

Military service
- Allegiance: Republic of China; People's Republic of China
- Branch/service: Chinese Red Army People's Liberation Army
- Years of service: 1911–1982
- Rank: Marshal of People's Republic of China
- Commands: division commander, Eighth Route Army, Commander-in-Chief, Central China Field Army
- Battles/wars: Xinhai Revolution; Northern Expedition; Chinese Civil War; Long March; Second Sino-Japanese War; Hundred Regiments Offensive; Sino-Indian War
- Awards: Order of Bayi (First Class Medal); Order of Independence and Freedom (First Class Medal); Order of Liberation (First Class Medal)

Chinese name
- Simplified Chinese: 刘伯承
- Traditional Chinese: 劉伯承
Transcriptions
Standard Mandarin
- Hanyu Pinyin: Liú Bóchéng
- Wade–Giles: Liu^{2} Po^{2}-ch'êng^{2}
Hakka
- Pha̍k-fa-sṳ: Liù Pak-sṳ̀n
Yue: Cantonese
- Yale Romanization: Làuh Baak-sìhng
- Jyutping: Lau^{4} Baak^{3}-sing^{4}
Southern Min
- Hokkien POJ: Lâu Peh-sêng

Given name
- Chinese: 明昭
Transcriptions
Standard Mandarin
- Hanyu Pinyin: Míngzhāo
- Wade–Giles: Ming^{2}-chao^{1}

Liu Mingzhao (simplified Chinese: 刘明昭; traditional Chinese: 劉明昭; pinyin: Liú Míngzhāo; Wade–Giles: Liu Ming-chao; 4 December 1892 – 7 October 1986), more commonly known as Liu Bocheng (Note: Bocheng was his courtesy name) (simplified Chinese: 刘伯承; traditional Chinese: 劉伯承; pinyin: Liú Bóchéng; Wade–Giles: Liu Po-ch'eng), was a Chinese military officer and Marshal of the People's Republic of China. Known as the 'half' of the "Three and A Half" Strategists of China in modern Chinese history, (Note: The other three are Lin Biao and Su Yu, commanders of the Chinese People's Liberation Army, and Kuomintang commander Bai Chongxi) he was recognised as a revolutionary, military strategist, and theoretician and one of the founders of the People's Liberation Army (PLA).

Liu's nicknames "The Kutuzov of China" and The "One-eyed Dragon", were a reflection of his character, military achievement, Soviet military education and the fact that he lost his right eye in battle.

== Early life ==
Liu Bocheng was born on 4 December 1892 in Kai County, Sichuan (now Kaizhou District, Chongqing). After his father's death, he left school at the age of 15 to work on the family farm. In 1912 he entered the military academy of the Sichuan military government, and after graduating he served as a junior officer under Xiong Kewen. When the Second Revolution against Yuan Shikai failed in 1913, he fled to Shanghai, where in 1914 he joined Sun Yat-sen's Chinese Revolutionary Party.

== Military career ==
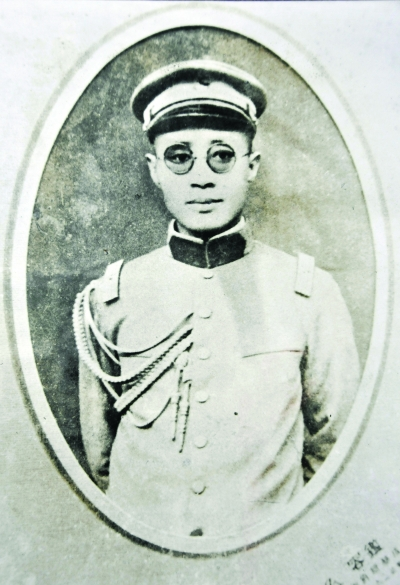
Liu while serving in the Sichuan Army in the 1920s

Liu returned to Sichuan at the end of 1915, during the National Protection War against Yuan Shikai, and helped to raise a local anti-Yuan force in eastern Sichuan. On 20 March 1916, while leading an attack on Fengdu, he was shot in the head and lost his right eye. According to a popular story, he refused anaesthesia during surgery on the eye, and his German surgeon called him a "military god". He later rose through the Sichuan Army, serving as a brigade chief of staff in the Constitutional Protection War in 1917 and as a regimental commander by 1920.

In 1923, Liu commanded troops in the Sichuan fighting against the allies of Wu Peifu until he was badly wounded in the right leg. While recovering in Chengdu, he met the Communists Yang Angong and Wu Yuzhang, and in May 1926 he joined the Chinese Communist Party (CCP). In December 1926 he was commander-in-chief of the Luzhou–Shunqing uprising in Sichuan, which was launched in support of the Northern Expedition. As commander of the 15th Provisional Army of the National Revolutionary Army, he held Luzhou against the warlord Liu Xiang until May 1927.

=== Chinese Civil War (1927–1937) ===
Liu was chief of staff of the Nanchang uprising of 1 August 1927. After the insurgents were defeated in eastern Guangdong, he went to Shanghai, and in November 1927 he went to the Soviet Union to study. He attended the CCP's 6th National Congress, held near Moscow in 1928, and then studied at the Frunze Military Academy. During the Sino-Soviet conflict of 1929, he and Ye Jianying helped to train a Chinese volunteer guerrilla unit in Khabarovsk.

After returning to China in 1930, Liu worked in Shanghai as head of the staff department of the party's Central Military Commission, where he assisted Zhou Enlai and taught short military courses. He arrived in the Jiangxi Soviet in January 1932 and became president of the Red Army School, and in October 1932 he became chief of the general staff of the Red Army. At the Ningdu Conference that month he sided with the majority that removed Mao Zedong from front-line command. He helped Zhu De and Zhou Enlai direct the successful fourth counter-encirclement campaign in 1933, and he wrote and translated a number of military manuals. During the fifth campaign in 1934, after disagreeing with Bo Gu and the Comintern adviser Otto Braun, he was demoted to chief of staff of the Red 5th Army Group.

Liu was restored as chief of the general staff in December 1934, early in the Long March. In January 1935, he directed the crossing of the Wu River and the capture of Zunyi, and he attended the Zunyi Conference. In May 1935, as commander of the vanguard, he became the sworn brother of the Yi leader Xiao Yedan at Yihai, Sichuan, which allowed the Red Army to pass safely through the Yi areas of the Daliang Mountains. He then directed the crossing of the Dadu River at Anshunchang. After the Red Army's 1st and 4th Front Armies joined forces, Liu opposed Zhang Guotao's plan to move south, and Zhang removed him as chief of staff. Liu reached northern Shaanxi with the 2nd Front Army in October 1936. In December 1936 he was restored as chief of the general staff, and he also became vice-president of the Counter-Japanese Military and Political University.

=== Second Sino-Japanese War (1937–1945) ===
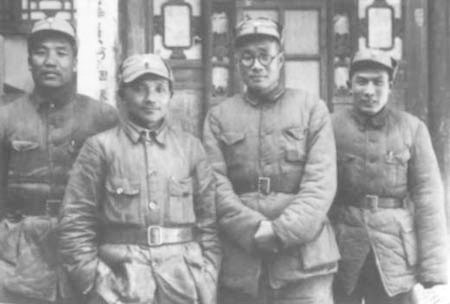
Leaders of the 129th Division. From left: Li Da, Deng Xiaoping, Liu and Cai Shufan

When the Red Army was reorganized as the Eighth Route Army in August 1937, Liu became commander of its 129th Division, with the Nationalist rank of lieutenant general. In October 1937 one of the division's regiments raided the Japanese airfield at Yangmingbao in Shanxi, destroying 24 aircraft. Deng Xiaoping became the division's political commissar in January 1938. The two men worked together for the next thirteen years, and the forces they led became known as the "Liu–Deng army".

In 1938 Liu's forces destroyed a Japanese column of more than 1,500 men at Shentouling, recaptured eighteen county towns, and drove the Japanese out of south-eastern Shanxi. The division then expanded into the plains of southern Hebei, where it built a guerrilla base area. In April 1940 Liu set out the operational principle that "when the enemy advances, we advance" (into the enemy's rear). In August 1940 he took part in directing the Hundred Regiments Offensive with Peng Dehuai. During the offensive the 129th Division and units of the Shanxi–Chahar–Hebei Military Region destroyed more than two-thirds of the Zhengtai railway. In September 1943 he returned to Yan'an for the Rectification Movement, and in 1945 he was elected to the Central Committee at the 7th Party Congress.

=== Chinese Civil War (1945–1949) ===
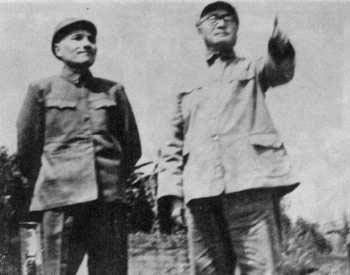
Liu and Deng Xiaoping directing operations before the Yangtze River Crossing campaign, 1949

In August 1945 Liu became commander of the Shanxi–Hebei–Shandong–Henan Military Region. In the Shangdang Campaign of September 1945 his forces destroyed about 35,000 of Yan Xishan's troops, and they won a further victory in the Pinghan campaign. Both strengthened Mao's position in the Chongqing Negotiations.

After full-scale civil war broke out in June 1946, Liu fought a series of mobile campaigns, including those at Dingtao and in northern Henan. According to his memoirs, his forces destroyed about 100 Nationalist brigades within a year. In mid-1947 he and Deng crossed the Yellow River and won the South-west Shandong campaign. They then made a long march south to establish a base in the Dabie Mountains, a move often seen as the start of the CCP's strategic offensive. In May 1948 Liu became commander of the Central Plains Military Region.

In the Huaihai campaign, which began in November 1948, Liu's Central Plains Field Army cut the Tianjin–Pukou railway and captured Suxian. It then led the attack on Huang Wei's army group. The campaign cost the Nationalists about 550,000 men and left Nanjing exposed. In February 1949 Liu's army became the Second Field Army, with Liu as commander. In April it crossed the Yangtze with the Third Field Army and captured Nanjing, where Liu became head of the Military Control Commission.

== People's Republic of China ==
In late 1949, Liu and Deng led the campaign that brought Sichuan, Yunnan, Guizhou and Xikang under CCP control. In January 1951 he became president and political commissar of the newly founded PLA Military Academy in Nanjing. There he trained instructors, wrote and translated textbooks, and added departments for the navy, air force, artillery and other arms, laying the foundations of the PLA's system of command academies.

In October 1954, Liu became head of the PLA's General Training Department. He was made a Marshal of the People's Republic of China in September 1955, and he was elected to the Politburo at the 8th Party Congress in 1956. In 1957 he became president of the Higher Military Academy.

In 1958, during a campaign against "dogmatism" in the army, Liu was criticized by Peng Dehuai and others as a leading representative of "military dogmatism". Although ill, he made a self-criticism at Huairen Hall in July, and in September he left the leadership of the academy. In 1980, Deng Xiaoping described the campaign as a mistake. Liu headed the Military Commission's strategy group from 1959, and he advised the PLA during the Sino-Indian War of 1962. He became a vice-chairman of the Central Military Commission in January 1966.

During the Cultural Revolution, Liu remained a member of the Politburo. In October 1969, when Lin Biao's "Order No. 1" dispersed senior commanders from Beijing, Liu offered to stay in the capital as an adviser to the Military Commission, but he was sent to Wuhan. He lost the sight of his remaining eye in 1972. Ill health later left him unable to look after himself, and in 1982 he retired from all his party, state and military posts. The Central Committee marked his retirement with a letter of tribute that called him "a marshal of a hundred battles" and "a Marxist military theorist".

Liu died in Beijing on 7 October 1986, aged 93. Deng Xiaoping presided over his memorial service in the Great Hall of the People, and Hu Yaobang gave the eulogy. In 2011, part of his ashes was interred at Jiangjunling in She County, Hebei, where the 129th Division had been headquartered.

== Legacy ==
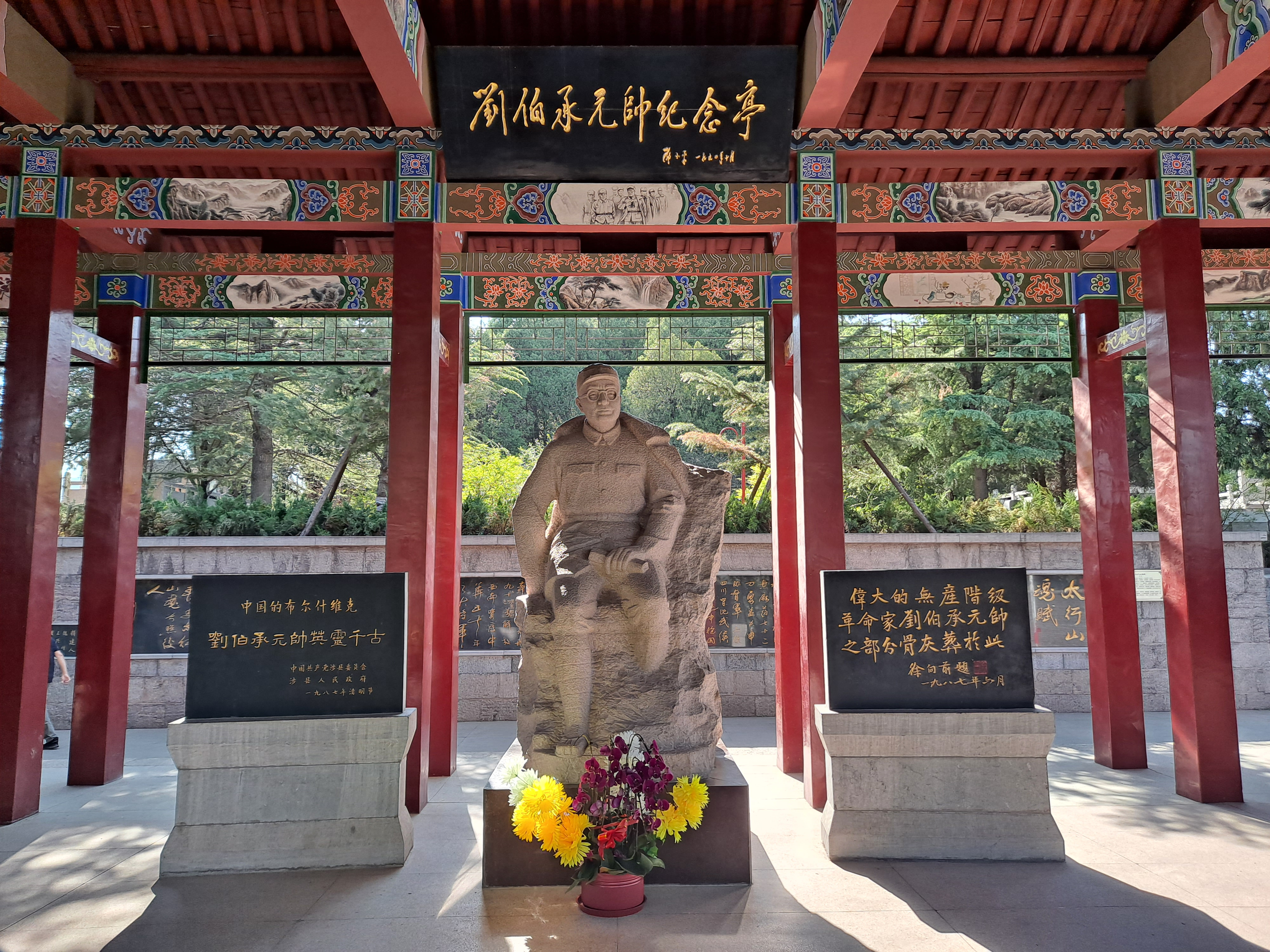
Marshal Liu Bocheng Memorial Pavilion, She County, Hebei

Liu placed great weight on preparation before battle. He summarized it as the "five factors" of mission, enemy, own forces, terrain and time, and he insisted that "without communications, there is no command".

The CCP's official obituary described Liu as one of the founders of the People's Liberation Army and as a great proletarian revolutionary and military strategist. Hu Yaobang's eulogy singled out his skill in command and his military writings. In 1989 the Central Military Commission named him one of the PLA's military strategists.

On Liu's fiftieth birthday in 1942, Zhu De praised his "benevolence, trustworthiness, wisdom, courage and strictness". In a tribute written after Liu's death, Deng Xiaoping called him "a great intellectual and a great military strategist of our party and our army" and credited him with a major contribution to Mao Zedong's military thought. The Nationalist general Bai Chongxi called him the Communists' fiercest commander. Some commentators have suggested that Liu's early withdrawal from field command after 1949 helped to protect him in later political campaigns. In his later years Liu reportedly refused to watch war films, saying that he was troubled by the thought of the widows and mothers who had lost husbands and sons in the wars.

== Personal life ==
Liu married three times. In 1910, he married Cheng Yizhi (1894–1957), who remained in his home village after he left. Their son, Liu Juntai, was born in 1912 and died of starvation in 1961. In 1930, he married Wu Jingchun, but the couple lost contact when he left for the Communist base areas in 1932. In 1936 he married Wang Ronghua (1917–2008), who served in staff and political posts in the 129th Division and later became an adviser in the General Office of the Central Military Commission. They had seven children. Three of their sons, Liu Taihang, Liu Taichi and Liu Meng, and their daughter Liu Miqun became major generals in the PLA. Their eldest daughter, Liu Huabei, was murdered in 1945, and the case has never been solved.

== In popular culture ==
Liu has been depicted in films including Young Liu Bocheng (1996) and The Founding of a Republic (2009), and in television series including Drawing Sword (2005) and Marshal Liu Bocheng (2012).

== See also ==
- List of generals of the People's Republic of China
- Outline of the military history of the People's Republic of China
