= Huairen Hall =

Chinese Politburo building in Beijing

Coordinates: 39.9153°N 116.3777°E

- Simplified Chinese: 怀仁堂
- Traditional Chinese: 懷仁堂
- Literal meaning: Hall of Cherished Compassion
Transcriptions
Standard Mandarin
- Hanyu Pinyin: Huáiréntáng
- Wade–Giles: Huai2-jen2-t'ang2

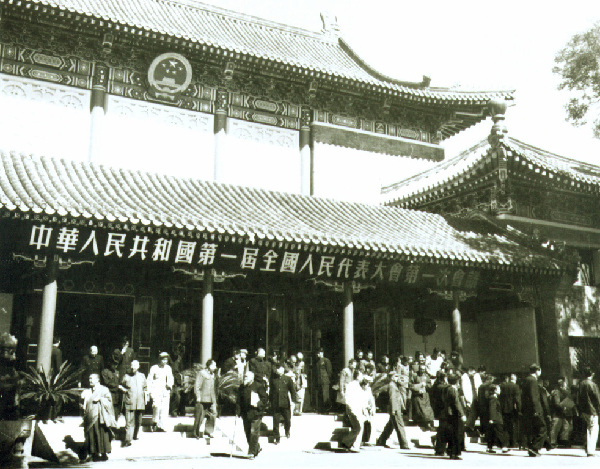
Huairen Hall in 1954 during the first meeting of the National People's Congress

The Huairen Hall or Huairentang (simplified Chinese: 怀仁堂; traditional Chinese: 懷仁堂) is a building inside Zhongnanhai, the Chinese government's leadership compound in Beijing. It has been the site of several major events in Chinese history. Huairen Hall is the main meeting place of the Politburo of the Chinese Communist Party (CCP) and an alternate meeting place of the CCP Politburo Standing Committee. The building is also the meeting location of several of the CCP's leading groups such as the Financial and Economic Affairs Leading Group and the Leading Group for Comprehensively Deepening Reforms. The building has a main auditorium that can seat approximately a thousand people as well as a conference room on the second floor that is used for smaller scale meetings.

== History ==
Construction of the hall began in 1885 and was overseen by Yixuan, Prince Chun. In 1888 the hall became the daily workplace of Dowager Empress Cixi, the then de facto ruler of China, replacing the Hall of Mental Cultivation in the nearby Forbidden City. After the Boxer Rebellion, Huairentang became the headquarters of occupying Eight Nation Alliance's commander Alfred von Waldersee. In 1902 Empress Cixi rebuilt Huairentang at a cost of five million taels of silver and in 1908 she died there.

After the founding of the Republic of China in 1911, President Yuan Shikai used the building to meet with foreign guests and to accept New Year's Day greetings. After Yuan's death, it was the site of his funeral. When Cao Kun became president, he used Huairentang as his residence. After the end of the Beiyang Government Huairentang had no permanent use and was given to the Beijing City Government.

After the founding of the People's Republic of China, Premier Zhou Enlai began plans to hold the first plenary session of the Chinese People's Political Consultative Conference at Huairen Hall in September of 1949. In order for the building to serve as a sufficiently sized audience hall, an iron sheet roof was erected over one of the building's original courtyards. This reconstruction was only temporary and as part of the "Huairen Hall Expansion Project" a more permanent two-story auditorium was built on the site which has largely remained unchanged to this day. The new meeting hall was then used for first session of the National People's Congress in 1954. Huairen Hall became the auditorium of the central government, often hosting various art shows and political meetings, including CCP Central Committee plenums before the construction of Jingxi Hotel in 1964.

=== Historical events ===
- 1930 - Central Plains War: During the second session of an expanded meeting of the Kuomintang Central Executive Committee, opponents of Chiang Kai-shek jointly elected Yan Xishan as president of the national government.
- 1949 - The first plenary session of the Chinese People's Political Consultative Conference
- 1951 - The "Agreement between the Central People's Government and the Tibetan Local Government on the Peaceful Liberation of Tibet" was signed in Huairentang.
- 1954 - The first Session of the first National People's Congress.
- 1955 - The Huairentang grant, Mao Zedong on behalf of the central government awarded ten People's Liberation Army generals the rank of Marshal.
- 1958 - Liu Bocheng is criticized as part of the CCP's anti-dogmatism campaign.
- 1967 - February Countercurrent.
- 1976 - The "Huairentang Incident": The "Gang of Four" were arrested, marking the end of the Cultural Revolution.
- 1989 - Hu Yaobang collapsed during a Politburo meeting in Huairentang, and subsequently died, sparking the Tiananmen Square protests of 1989.

== Structure ==
Huairen Hall is on the west bank of Zhongnanhai's Middle Lake.

It has staggered roofs with glazed green tile that fall in curved lines to upturned corners. It has a grey brick façade with red wooden pillars, windows, and doors.

The structure includes numerous smaller meeting rooms in addition to its large auditorium.
