= Taewonsu =

Highest military rank in North Korea

Taewonsu Grand marshal
- Shoulder boards for the rank of taewŏnsu
- Country: North Korea
- Service branch: Korean People's Army
- Formation: April 1992
- Next lower rank: Konghwaguk Wonsu (Note: 공화국 원수; 共和國元帥) (Marshal of the Republic)

- Taewonsu
- Hangul: 대원수
- Hanja: 大元帥
- RR: daewonsu
- MR: taewŏnsu

Taewonsu (Korean: 대원수; lit. 'grand marshal') is the highest possible military rank of North Korea and is intended to be an honorific title for Kim Il Sung, Kim Jong Il and Kim Jong Un. It is often confused with Marshal of the Republic and Marshal of the Korean People's Army, but ranks above both. The rank is senior to that of Wonsu. The title also exists in Chinese military history as dàyuánshuài (same Sino-Korean characters 大元帥), and was briefly taken by Sun Yat-sen.

== History ==
The rank of taewonsu was created by a joint decision of the Central Committee and Central Military Commission of the Workers' Party of Korea, the National Defence Commission and the Central People's Committee in April 1992 to honor Kim Il-sung on his 80th birthday (Day of the Sun). In February 2012, his son and successor Kim Jong-il was awarded the title posthumously on the occasion of his official 70th birthday (Day of the Shining Star).

The insignia for taewonsu is similar to wonsu but with an added crest worn beneath the shoulder board's large marshal star (and an added crest added to the parade uniform's marshal star worn below the collar), below the Emblem of North Korea. The rank insignia is based on the rank of Generalissimo of the Soviet Union.

In October of 2026, the rank insignia previously located at former leaders' shrines was removed.

== See also ==
- Dayuanshuai in Chinese
- Dai-gensui, the Japanese equivalent
- Wonsu, a rank lower than Taewonsu
- Gensui
- Generalissimo, the class of rank into which Taewonsu falls.
