= Dayuanshuai =

Chinese military rank equivalent to grand marshal

Dàyuánshuài 大元帥
- Shoulder boards for the PLA rank
- Country: Republic of China; People's Republic of China
- Service branch: National Revolutionary Army; People's Liberation Army
- Abolished: 1965
- Next lower rank: Yuánshuài

Dayuanshuai

Chinese name
- Traditional Chinese: 大元帥
- Simplified Chinese: 大元帅
Transcriptions
Standard Mandarin
- Hanyu Pinyin: dàyuánshuài
- Wade–Giles: ta-yüan-shuai
Yue: Cantonese
- Yale Romanization: daaih yùhn seui
- Jyutping: daai jyun seoi

Dàyuánshuài (simplified Chinese: 大元帅; traditional Chinese: 大元帥; lit. 'Great chief commander') was a Chinese military rank, usually translated as grand marshal.

During the early Republic of China, the rank of "grand marshal of the army and navy" (陸海軍大元帥; 陆海军大元帅; lùhǎijūn dàyuánshuài) was assumed by Yuan Shikai in 1913, Sun Yat-sen in 1917 and Zhang Zuolin in 1927.

The rank was replaced by the Nationalist government with the "general special class" or "generalissimo" (特級上將; 特级上将; tèjí shàngjiàng) and awarded to Chiang Kai-shek in 1935.

The rank of "grand marshal of the People's Republic of China" (中华人民共和国大元帅; Zhōnghuá rénmín gònghéguó dàyuánshuài) was proposed after the establishment of the People's Republic for Mao Zedong, but was refused by Mao.

== Background ==
=== Grand Marshals historically and in China ===
In the Chinese context, "Grand Marshal" or "Grand General" (Chinese: 大將軍) have appeared in ancient China as titles for supreme commanders of the army. For example, "Grand Marshal of the World Soldiers and Horses" in the Liao Dynasty was an important title for the crown prince or the heir to the throne, but they were only court titles rather than military ranks. After modern China, the "General Marshal" became the honorary or post title of the head of state or the supreme commander of the national armed forces, but they were not official military ranks, for example: Emperor Guangxu of the Qing Dynasty Zaiyun and Emperor Xuantong's father Jianguo regent The prince Zaifeng was appointed as the 'Marshal of the Navy and the Army'. The Northern Government of the Republic of China, such as Yuan Shikai, Li Yuanhong, Duan Qirui, and Zhang Zuolin, all served as the "Marshals of the Navy and Army." "General Marshal of the Army", Pu Yi once served as "Marshal of the Army and Navy of Manchuria" and so on. After the outbreak of the Anti-Japanese War in 1937, Chiang Kai-shek was appointed as the "Grand Marshal of the Army, Navy and Air Force of the Republic of China" and became the last General Marshal of the Republic of China. This "Grand Marshal" was also the title of the highest military commander during the war. It was a symbolic and informal title. After the founding of the People's Republic of China, the military rank system was established for the first time in 1955, and the rank of "Grand Marshal" became the PRC's highest official military rank, but it was never awarded.

=== The People's Liberation Army plans to implement the military rank system ===
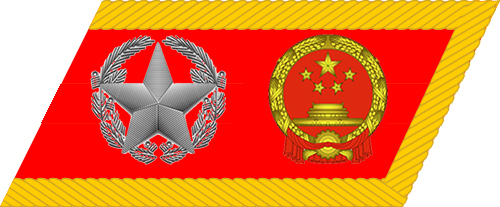
Collar insignia of the Grand Marshal of the People's Republic of China

The military rank system is a military management system that indicates the military rank, social status, and honor of soldiers. The implementation of the military rank system is an important measure and symbol of the normalization and modernization of the military. The predecessors of the Chinese Communist Party's People's Liberation Army, the Chinese Workers’ and Peasants’ Red Army, the Eighth Route Army, and the New Fourth Army did not implement the military rank system. The People's Liberation Army did not implement the military rank system at first. However, in 1939, 1946, and 1948, prior to the founding of the People's Republic of China, the People's Liberation Army and the Chinese Communist Party had deliberated on and decided against implementing the military rank system. In 1955, Chairman Mao Zedong was offered the rank of Grand Marshal, which he declined; he also ordered that only cadres who are still active officers in the PLA are to be given ranks. Thus, Deng Xiaoping, Liu Shaoqi and Zhou Enlai also declined ranks.

==== The outbreak of the Korean War and the completion of the military rating work ====
At the same time that the PLA began preparations for military ranks, the Korean War broke out and China intervened in the war, resulting in the suspension of preparations. It was also during the Korean War that the importance of the military rank system was manifested. For example, on the battlefield, the Chinese and North Korean armies fought in concert, but the Korean People's Army had military ranks, while the People's Volunteer Army, adapted from the People's Liberation Army, had no military ranks. The command relationship brought many inconveniences, and it also made Peng Dehuai, commander and political commissar of the Volunteer Army, feel the necessity of establishing a military rank system. Later, someone cited the example of the negotiations that led to the Korean Armistice Agreement, pointing out that during the Sino-US negotiations, the United States Armed Forces had military ranks but the volunteers did not. For the sake of "equal equality", China could only temporarily assign "military ranks" to negotiators. The emergence of such an embarrassing situation also shows the urgency of China to establish a military rank system to facilitate international exchanges. In August 1951, Peng Dehuai sent a telegram to Mao Zedong, stating: "The requirement for job identification is necessary in the current battle." The prerequisite for establishing military ranks is to rank officers. In October of the same year, the Central Military Commission instructed the entire army to carry out cadre rating work. In April 1952, when Peng Dehuai returned to China for treatment, the central government decided to let him stay in Beijing to preside over the daily work of the Military Commission, focusing on military reform work including the assessment of officer ranks and the establishment of a military rank system. The rating work was basically completed that year.

== List of rank holders ==
Portrait	Name (born–died)	Term of office			Ref.
Portrait	Name (born–died)	Date promoted	Date retired	Time serving	Ref.
	Yuan Shikai (1859–1916)	1913	1916 †	2–3 years	
	Sun Yat-sen (1866–1925)	1917	1925 †	7–8 years	
	Zhang Zuolin (1875–1928)	1927	1928 †	0–1 years	

== See also ==
- Military ranks of the Republic of China (1912–1949)
- Ranks of the People's Liberation Army Ground Force
- Taewonsu
- Dai-gensui
