= Wonsu =

Korean military rank

- Hangul: 원수
- Hanja: 元帥
- RR: wonsu
- MR: wŏnsu

Wonsu is the highest military rank in the armed forces of North Korea and South Korea.

== Historical ==
The title of Wonsu or its variations had been used as the title of high-ranking military commanders in Korean history since Goryeo Dynasty onward. For example, Gwon Yul, a famous general in 16th century who rose to the supreme command of Korean forces during Imjin War held the title of "Do-wonsu", roughly translated as "high marshal".

== North Korea ==
Wonsu is a rank in the Korean People's Army of North Korea, equivalent to marshal in other armies. This rank is held by all Supreme Leaders of the DPRK.

While serving as the Supreme Commander of the Korean People's Army, Kim Il Sung became North Korea's first Marshal of the Democratic People's Republic of Korea on February 7, 1953, during the Korean War. The original marshal's rank insignia featured the North Korean coat of arms above a star. In 1954, the insignia was modified to resemble its Soviet counterpart, with the star positioned beside the coat of arms rather than below it.

The rank of vice marshal (chasu) is unique to the North Korean ranking system. Vice marshal was first conferred in February 1953 on Choe Yong-gon. Sources suggest that the shoulder board rank insignia for marshal and vice marshal then became a single large star without the state coat-of-arms (for marshals) and the state coat-of-arms without a star (for vice marshals). By the time the next conferral of rank to vice marshal was awarded (1985), the shoulder board rank insignia for marshal and vice marshal had taken on their current design.

The next change in the DPRK marshal ranks took place in 1992 when the rank of dae wonsu or grand marshal (full title grand marshal of the Democratic People's Republic of Korea) was created for Kim Il Sung. At this time the rank of marshal was divided into two ranks: the rank of marshal with the title "marshal of the Democratic People's Republic of Korea" (konghwaguk wonsu) was conferred upon Kim Il Sung's son Kim Jong Il, and the same rank but with the title "marshal of the Korean People's Army" was conferred upon O Jin-u. In 1995, two other military officers were conferred the rank of marshal with the title "marshals of the Korean People's Army", i.e. Choe Kwang and Ri Ul-sol. Insignia of rank of the two grades of marshal are different (with the insignia for marshal of the Democratic People's Republic of Korea being more like that of grand marshal—the grand marshal insignia has a larger wreath encompassing the marshal's star—but is smaller as it is below the star itself).

Also, in 1992 eight other generals were promoted to vice marshal at which time in North Korea there was one grand marshal, one marshal of the Democratic People's Republic of Korea, one marshal of the Korean People's Army and eight vice marshals.

The rank (as marshal of the DPRK) was bestowed to Kim Jong Un in 2012, who was since commonly referred to as the dear "Marshal" (원수님) as his affectionate moniker.

On April 15, 2016, Kim Yong-chun and Hyon Chol-hae were promoted to the rank of Marshal of the Korean People's Army, the first promotions of active duty officers after 21 years.

=== Insignia ===
Rank group	General/flag officers
Native name	대원수/大元帥; Tae wonsu	공화국원수/共和國元帥; Konghwaguk wonsu	인민군원수/人民軍元帥; Inmingun-wonsu
Literal translation	Grand marshal	Marshal of the Republic	Marshal of the Army
Insignia

=== List of Marshals of the Democratic People's Republic of Korea ===
Marshal of the Democratic People's Republic of Korea 조선민주주의인민공화국 원수
Marshal	Date of promotion	Notes
Kim Il Sung 김일성; 1912–1994	7 February 1953	Promoted to Grand Marshal of the Democratic People's Republic of Korea on 13 April 1992.
Kim Jong Il 김정일; 1941–2011	20 April 1992	Posthumously promoted to Grand Marshal of the Democratic People's Republic of Korea on 14 February 2012.
Kim Jong Un 김정은 born 1984	18 July 2012	Promoted to Marshal of the Democratic People's Republic of Korea in July 2012. However, on 29 July 2022, KCTV released a photo of Kim wearing Taewonsu.

=== List of Marshals of the Korean People's Army ===
Marshal of the Korean People's Army 조선인민군 원수
Marshal	Date of promotion	Notes
O Jin-u 오진우; 1917–1995	20 April 1992	
Choe Kwang 최광; 1918–1997	8 October 1995	
Ri Ul-sol 리을설; 1921–2015	8 October 1995	
Kim Yong-chun 김영춘; 1936–2018	14 April 2016	
Hyon Chol-hae 현철해; 1934–2022	14 April 2016	
Ri Pyong-chol 리병철 born 1948	5 October 2020	
Pak Jong-chon 박정천	5 October 2020	Demoted to Vice Marshal of the Korean People's Army in June 2021, and was promoted back at an undisclosed time before September 2023.

== South Korea ==
Wonsu 원수
- Insignia
- Country: South Korea
- Service branch: Army; Navy; Air Force
- Rank group: General officer
- Next lower rank: Daejang

Wonsu (Korean: 원수), known in English as "General of the Army/Air Force of the Republic of Korea" or "Admiral of the Fleet of the Republic of Korea", is the highest military rank of the Republic of Korea (ROK) armed forces and is the combined equivalent of a field marshal, fleet admiral and marshal of the Air Force in other nations. The rank is senior to that of Daejang. As of 21 November 2026, Wonsu only exists on paper, and has never been held by an officer of the South Korean Armed Forces. According to the Armed Forces Personnel Act of National Defense Law of the Republic of Korea, the wonsu is appointed from the daejang who has distinguished achievements. Paik Sun-yup was considered by the government to be promoted to wonsu in 2009, but this did not materialize.

The rank insignia for wonsu is heavily influenced by United States military insignia of General of the Army and General of the Air Force for Army and Air Force. While the rank insignia for the Navy remains the same the sleeve insignia for a naval officer promoted to the rank is the same sleeve insignia of Fleet admiral used in the United States Navy.

== Homophone ==
Coincidentally, wonsu is also a word meaning "mortal enemy" (怨讐). The two words have different etymologies and hanja, but in South Korea are homophonous and so are written identically in hangul. In North Korea, the government has addressed the issue by changing the word for "enemy" to "wonssu" (원쑤).

== See also ==
- Yuan Shuai, the Chinese equivalent, written identically in Hanja/Hanzi
- Republic of Korea Armed Forces
- Korean People's Army
- Six-star rank
