= Field marshal (disambiguation) =

Field marshal may refer to:

== Rank ==
- Field marshal, the top Army officer rank used by various countries
- Field marshal (Australia)
- Field marshal (Egypt) - refer Mushir
- Field marshal (Finland)
- Field marshal (France)
- Field marshal (India)
- Field marshal (Iran)
- Field marshal (Japan) - refer Gensui (Imperial Japanese Army)
- Field marshal (Libya)
- Field marshal (Malaysia) - refer Yang di-Pertuan Agong
- Field marshal (Philippines)
- Field marshal (Pakistan)
- Field marshal (Serbia and Yugoslavia)
- Field marshal (South Africa)
- Field marshal (Sri Lanka)
- Field marshal (Thailand) - refer Chom Phon
- Field marshal (New Zealand)
- Field marshal (Uganda)
- Field marshal (United Kingdom)
- Generalfeldmaschall (Germany)
- General-feldmarshal (Russian Empire)

== People ==
See List of field marshals

== Other ==
- The Field Marshal (film) 1927
- "The Field-Marshal", Russian song by Mussorgsky
- Field Marshal Montgomery Pipe Band
- Fieldmarshal (Role Variant), one of the 16 role variants of the Keirsey Temperament Sorter
- Field Marshall, a model of agricultural tractor made in England from 1945 to 1957
- Field Marshall, an introductory war game published by Jedko Games in 1975
- Field Marshals' Hall of the Winter Palace in Saint Petersburg, Russia
- Field Marshal: The 13th and second highest PvP honor rank of the Alliance in World of Warcraft

== See also ==
- Five-star rank
- Generalissimo
- List of field marshals
  - List of Austrian field marshals
  - List of Austro-Hungarian field marshals
  - List of British field marshals
  - List of German field marshals
  - List of Iranian field marshals
  - List of Russian field marshals
  - List of Swedish field marshals
  - List of Thai field marshals
  - Lists of Turkish field marshals
- Marshal of the Soviet Union
- Mariscal de Campo, literally Field Marshal, is the Spanish word for "quarterback" in American football: (see es:Mariscal de campo (fútbol americano))
