= List of field marshals =

This is a list of the officers who have held the army rank of field marshal or marshal. It does not include air force marshals.

== Afghanistan ==
- HM Nasrullah Khan (1875–1920)
- 2004 - Mohammed Fahim (1957–2014)
- 2020 - Abdul Rashid Dostum (b. 1954)

== Albania ==
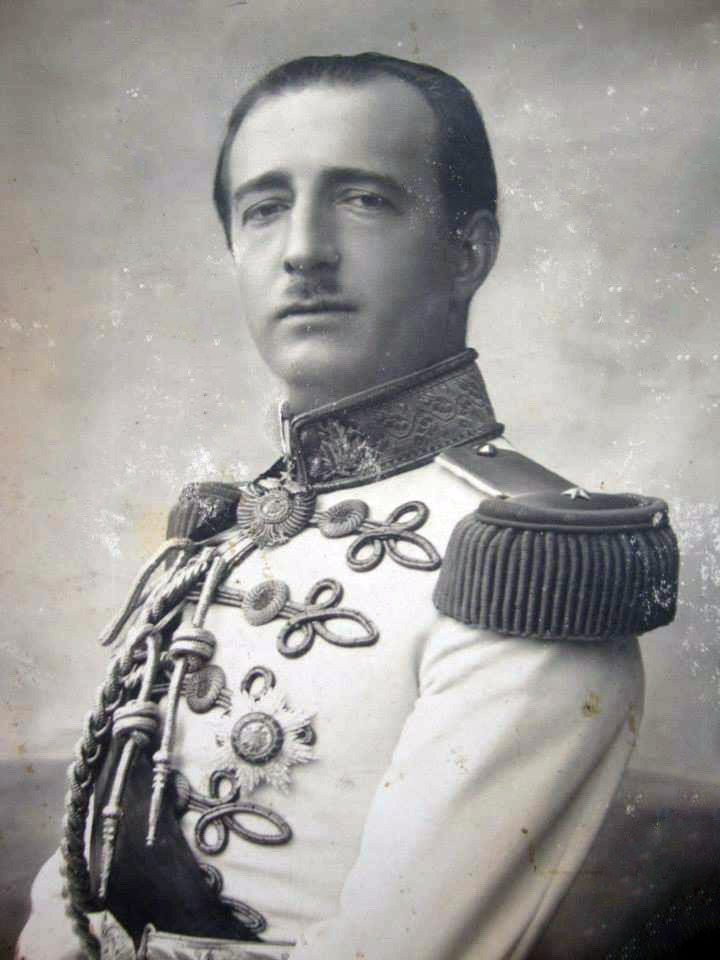
King Zog I of the Albanians

- 1 September 1928 - HM King Zog (1895–1961)

== Australia ==
- 20 March 1925 - William Riddell Birdwood, 1st Baron Birdwood (1865–1951; honorary)
- 2 June 1938 - HM King George VI (1895–1952; honorary)
- 8 June 1950 - Sir Thomas Blamey (1884–1951)
- 1 April 1954 - HRH Prince Philip, Duke of Edinburgh (1921–2021; honorary)
- 19 October 2024 - HM King Charles III (b. 1948; honorary)

== Austria/Austria-Hungary ==
- List of Austrian field marshals
- List of Marshals of Austria

== Bahrain ==
- HM King Hamad bin Isa Al Khalifa (b. 1950)
- HRH Crown Prince Salman bin Hamad bin Isa Al Khalifa (b. 1969)
- 8 February 2011 - Khalifa bin Ahmed Al Khalifa (b. 1946)

== Brandenburg ==
- List of Brandenburger field marshals

== Brazil ==
- List of Brazilian marshals

== Chad ==
- 11 August 2020 - Idriss Déby (1952–2021)

== Cambodia ==
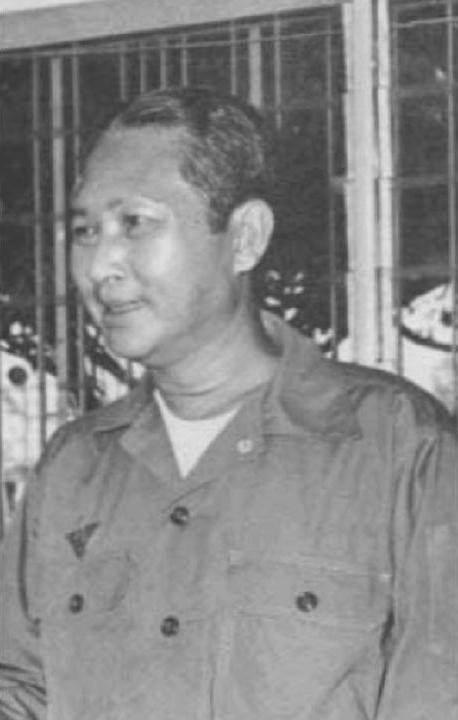
Lon Nol

- 1971 - Lon Nol (1913–1985)
- HRH Prince Norodom Ranariddh (1944–2021)
- 2009 - Heng Samrin (b. 1934)
- 2009 - Chea Sim (1932–2015)
- 2009 - Hun Sen (b. 1952)

== Central African Empire ==
- Jean-Bédel Bokassa (1921–1986)

== Republic of China ==
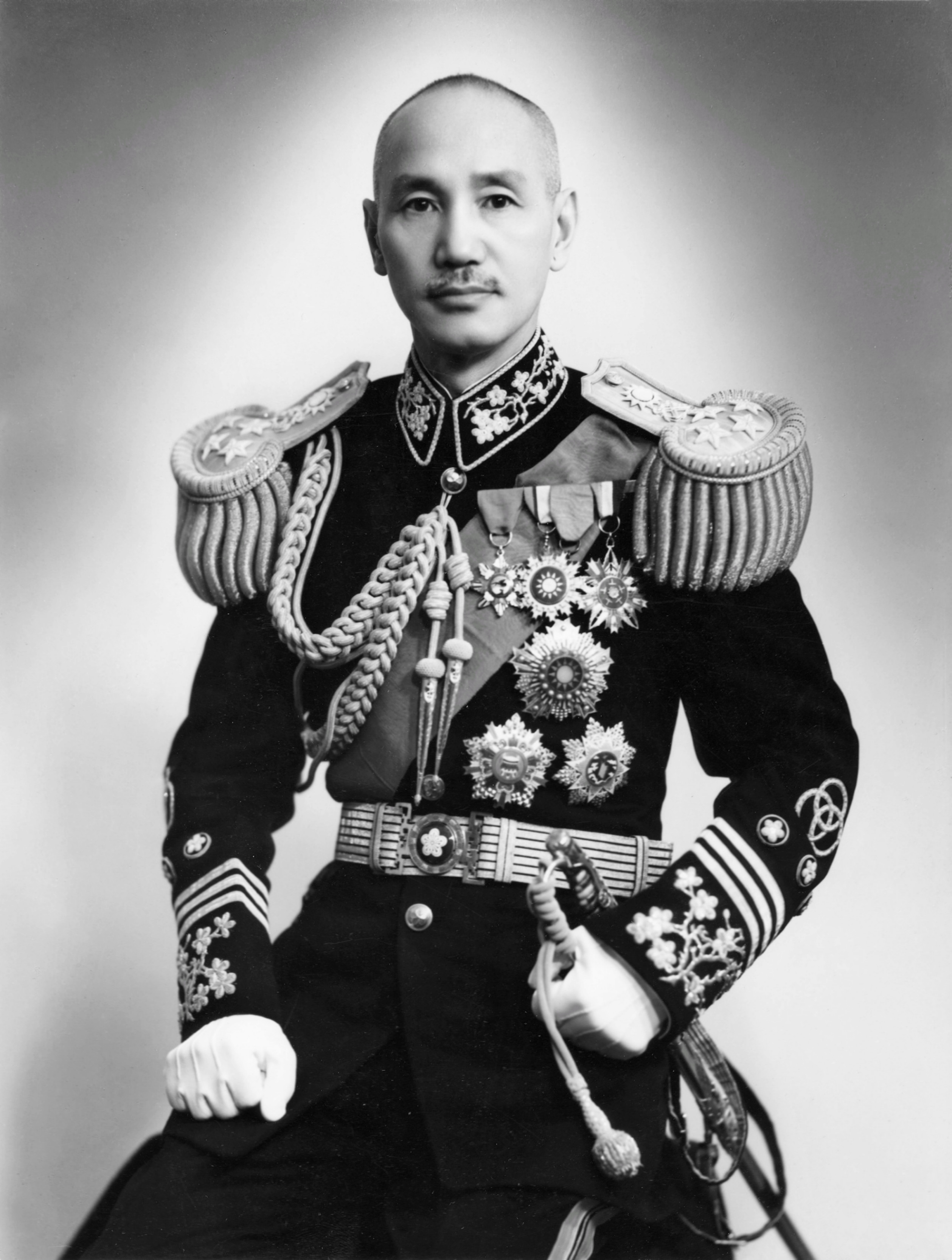
Chinese Chiang Kai-shek

- 1912 - Yuan Shikai (1859–1916)
- 1917 - Sun Yat-sen (1866–1925)
- 1921 - Tang Jiyao (1883–1927)
- 1921 - Lu Rongting (1859–1928)
- 1927 - Zhang Zuolin (1875–1928)
- 1935 - Chiang Kai-shek (1887–1975)

== People's Republic of China ==
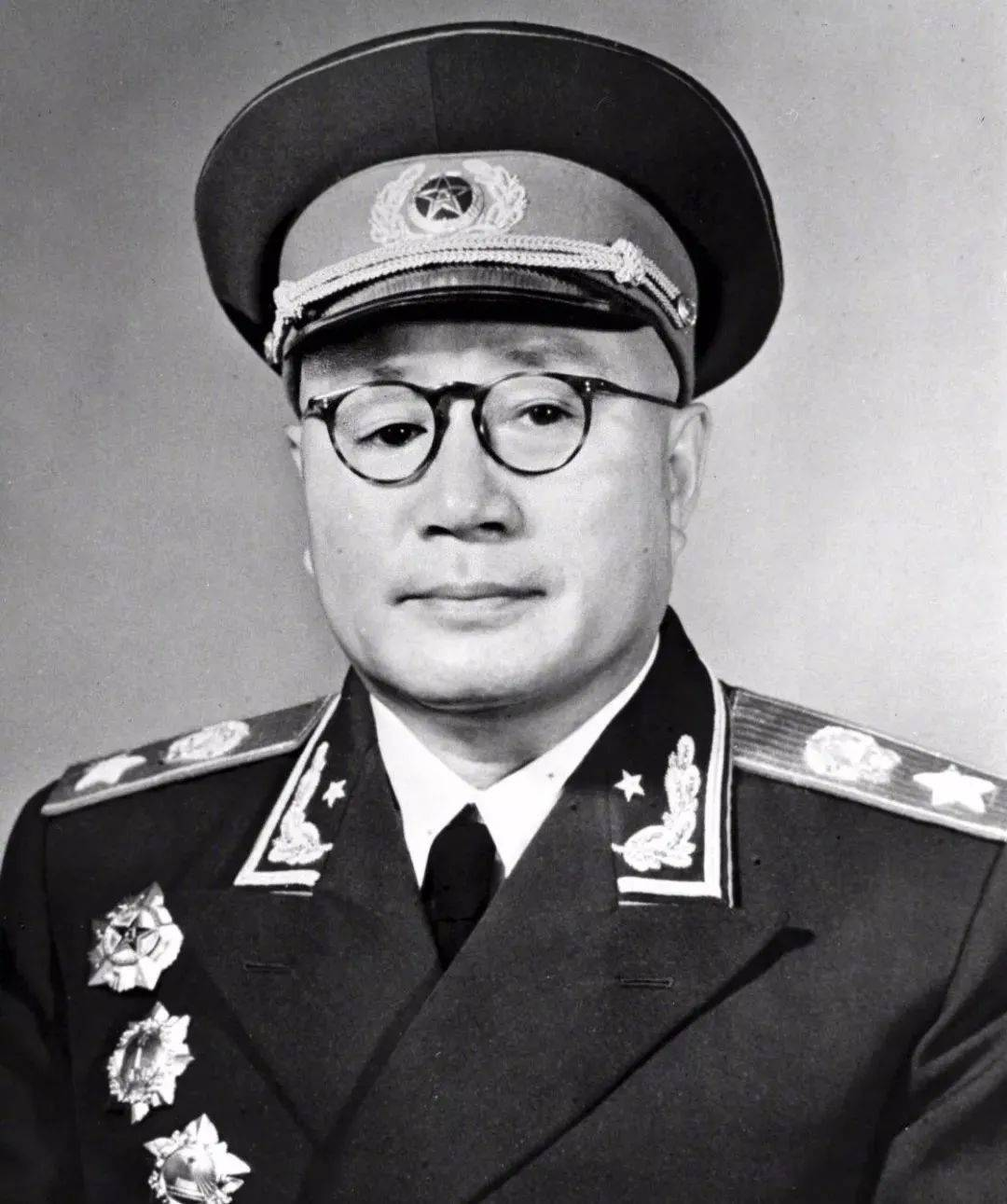
Liu Bocheng

- 1955 - Zhu De (1886–1976)
- 1955 - Peng Dehuai (1898–1974)
- 1955 - Lin Biao (1907–1971)
- 1955 - Liu Bocheng (1892–1986)
- 1955 - He Long (1896–1969)
- 1955 - Chen Yi (1901–1972)
- 1955 - Luo Ronghuan (1902–1963)
- 1955 - Xu Xiangqian (1901–1990)
- 1955 - Nie Rongzhen (1899–1992)
- 1955 - Ye Jianying (1897–1986)

== Republic of Croatia ==
- 1995 - Franjo Tuđman (1922–1999)

== Croatia ==
- 1941 - Slavko Kvaternik (1876–1947)

== Kingdom of Egypt ==
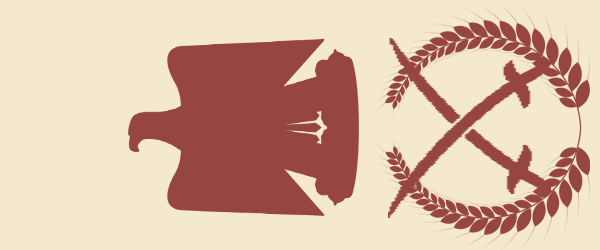
Field marshal insignia

- HH Abbas I Hilmi Pasha (1813–1854)
- HH Ibrahim Pasha (1789–1848)
- Yahya Mansur Yeghen (1837–1913)
- Horatio Herbert Kitchener (1850–1916)
- 20 December 1914 - HH Sultan Hussein Kamel (1853–1917)
- HM King Fuad I (1868–1936)
- 'Aziz 'Ali al-Misri (1879–1965)
- HM King Farouk (1920–1965)
- 1949 - HM King Abdullah I of Jordan (1882–1951)
- 26 July 1952 - HM King Fuad II (b. 1952)
- 21 February 1955 - HM King Hussein of Jordan (1935–1999)

== Republic of Egypt ==
- Abdel Hakim Amer (1919–1967)
- November 1973 - Ahmad Ismail Ali (1917–1974)
- Abdel Ghani el-Gamasy (1921–2003)
- Ahmed Badawi (1927–1981)
- Mohammed Aly Fahmy (1920–1999)
- Abd al-Halim Abu Ghazala (1930–2008)
- 1993 - Mohamed Hussein Tantawi (1935–2021)
- 2014 - Abdel Fattah el-Sisi (b. 1954)

== Ethiopia ==
- HIM Emperor Haile Selassie (1892–1975)
- 8 January 2022 - Birhanu Jula (b. 1965)

== Finland ==
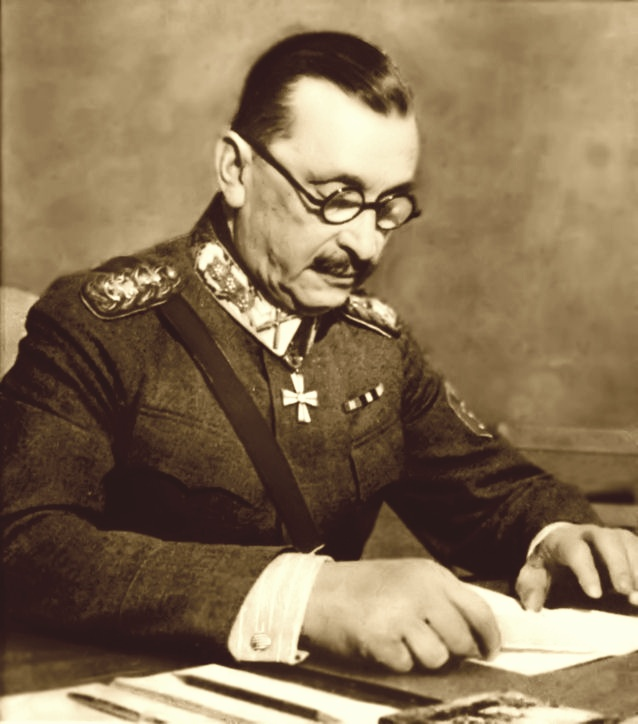
Finnish President Mannerheim in 1943

- 1933 - Carl Gustaf Emil Mannerheim (1867–1951)

== France ==
- List of Marshals of France

== Germany ==
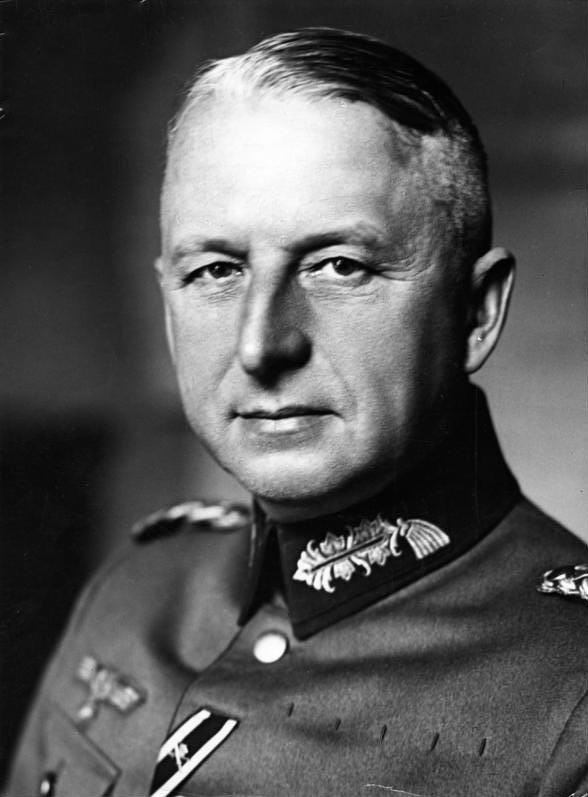
German World War II field marshal Erich von Manstein

- List of German field marshals

== Ghana ==
- 1965 - Kwame Nkrumah (1909–1972)

== Greece ==
- 1913 - HM King Constantine I (1868–1923)
- 1937 - HM King George II (1890–1947)
- 1947 - HM King Paul (1901–1964)
- 28 October 1949 - Alexandros Papagos (1883–1955)
- 1964 - HM King Constantine II (1940–2023)

== Guelders ==
- 1528 - Maarten van Rossum (1490–1555)

== Holy Roman Empire ==
- List of field marshals of the Holy Roman Empire

== India ==
- 1 January 1973 - Sam Manekshaw (1914–2008)
- 28 April 1986 - K. M. Cariappa (1899–1993)

== Iran ==
- List of Iranian field marshals

== Iraq ==
- List of Iraqi field marshals

== Italy ==
- List of Italian field marshals

== Japan ==
- List of Japanese field marshals

== Jordan ==
- 1948 - HM King Abdullah I (1882–1951)
- 20 July 1951 - HM King Talal (1909–1972)
- 11 August 1952 - HM King Hussein (1935–1999)
- Habis al-Majali (1914–2001)
- Fat'hi Abu Taleb (1933–2016)
- Abdul Hafeth Al Ka'abnah
- 7 February 1999 - HM King Abdullah II (b. 1962)
- 2005 - Sa'ad Khair (1951–2009)

== Liberia ==
- Samuel Doe (1951–1990)

== Libya ==
- 14 September 2016 - Khalifa Haftar (b. 1943)

== Malaysia ==
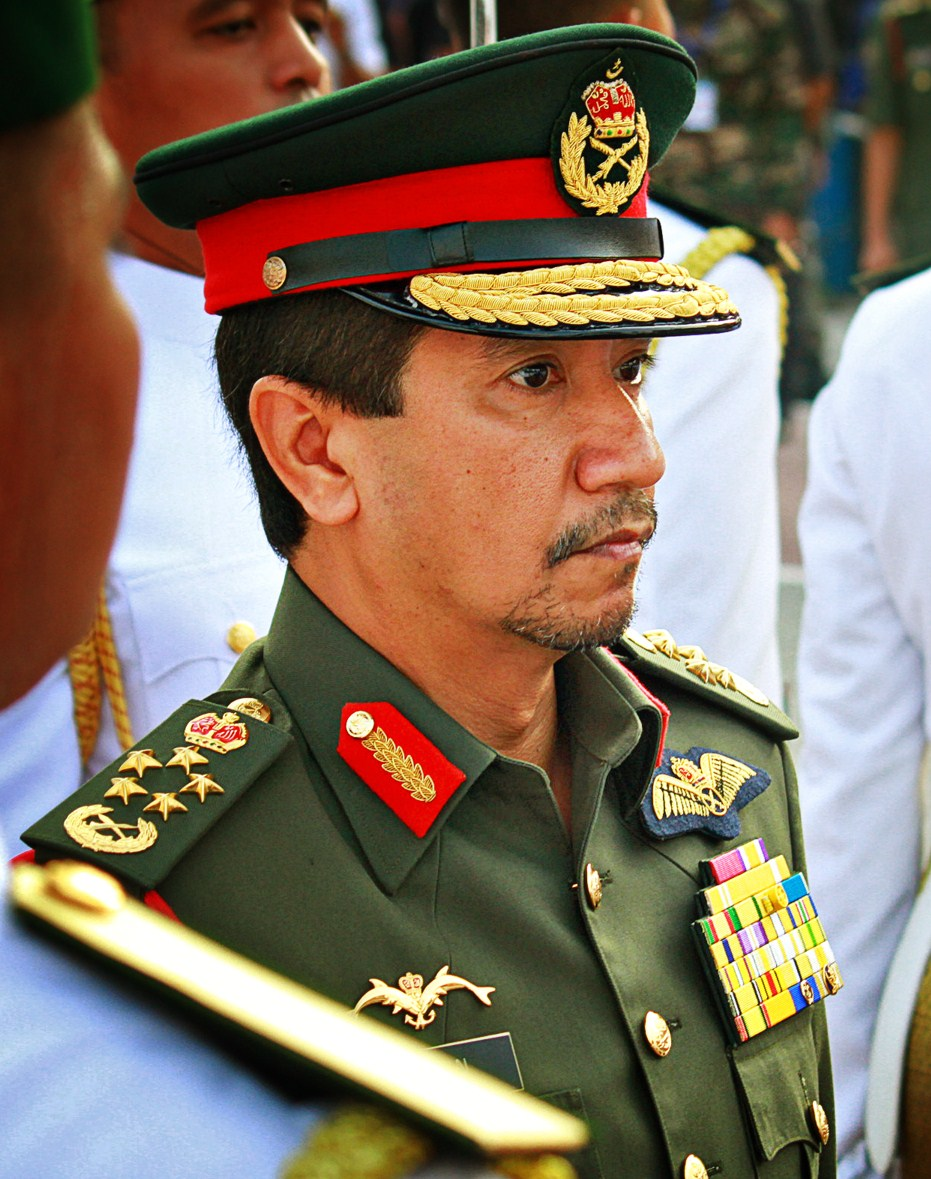
Sultan Mizan Zainal Abidin, Yang di-Pertuan Agong of Malaysia

- 31 August 1957 - Tuanku Abdul Rahman of Negeri Sembilan (1895–1960)
- 14 April 1960 - Sultan Hisamuddin Alam Shah of Selangor (1898–1960)
- 21 September 1960 - Tuanku Syed Putra of Perlis (1920–2000)
- 21 September 1965 - Sultan Ismail Nasiruddin Shah of Terengganu (1907–1979)
- 21 September 1970 - Tuanku Abdul Halim of Kedah (1927–2017)
- 21 September 1975 - Sultan Yahya Petra of Kelantan (1917–1979)
- 29 March 1979 - Sultan Ahmad Shah of Pahang (1930–2019)
- 26 April 1984 - Sultan Iskandar of Johor (1932–2010)
- 26 April 1989 - Sultan Azlan Shah of Perak (1928–2014)
- 26 April 1994 - Tuanku Jaafar of Negeri Sembilan (1922–2008)
- 26 April 1999 - Sultan Salahuddin Abdul Aziz Shah of Selangor (1926–2001)
- 13 December 2001 - Tuanku Syed Sirajuddin of Perlis (b. 1943)
- 13 December 2006 - Mizan Zainal Abidin of Terengganu (b. 1962)
- 13 December 2011 - Tuanku Abdul Halim of Kedah (1927–2017)
- 13 December 2016 - Muhammad V of Kelantan (b. 1969)
- 31 January 2019 - Abdullah of Pahang (b. 1959)
- 31 January 2024 - Ibrahim Ismail of Johor (b. 1958)

== Mongolia ==
- 1936 - Khorloogiin Choibalsan (1895–1952)
- 1936 - Gelegdorjiin Demid (1900–1937)
- 1979 - Yumjaagiin Tsedenbal (1916–1991)

== Morocco ==
- 17 November 1970 - Mohammed ben Mizzian (1897–1975)

== Mozambique ==
- Samora Machel (1933–1986)

== Nepal ==
- HH Maharaja Chandra Shamsher of Lambjang and Kaski (1863–1929)
- HH Maharaja Bhim Shamsher of Lambjang and Kaski (1865–1932)
- HH Maharaja Juddha Shamsher of Lambjang and Kaski (1875–1952)
- HH Maharaja Padma Shamsher of Lambjang and Kaski (1882–1961)
- HH Maharaja Mohan Shamsher of Lambjang and Kaski (1885–1967)
- HH Sir Keshar Shamsher Jung Bahadur Rana (1892–1964)
- Hari Shamsher Jang Bahadur Rana
- Sir Nir Shamsher Jang Bahadur Rana (1913–2013)
- Sir Kiran Shamsher Jang Bahadur Rana (1916–1983)
- 14 April 1953 - HM King Tribhuvan (1906–1955)
- 1954 - Rudra Shamsher Jang Bahadur Rana (1879–1964)
- 2 May 1956 - HM King Mahendra (1920–1972)
- 1972 - HM King Birendra (1945–2001)
- 2 June 2001 - HM King Gyanendra (b. 1947)

== New Zealand ==
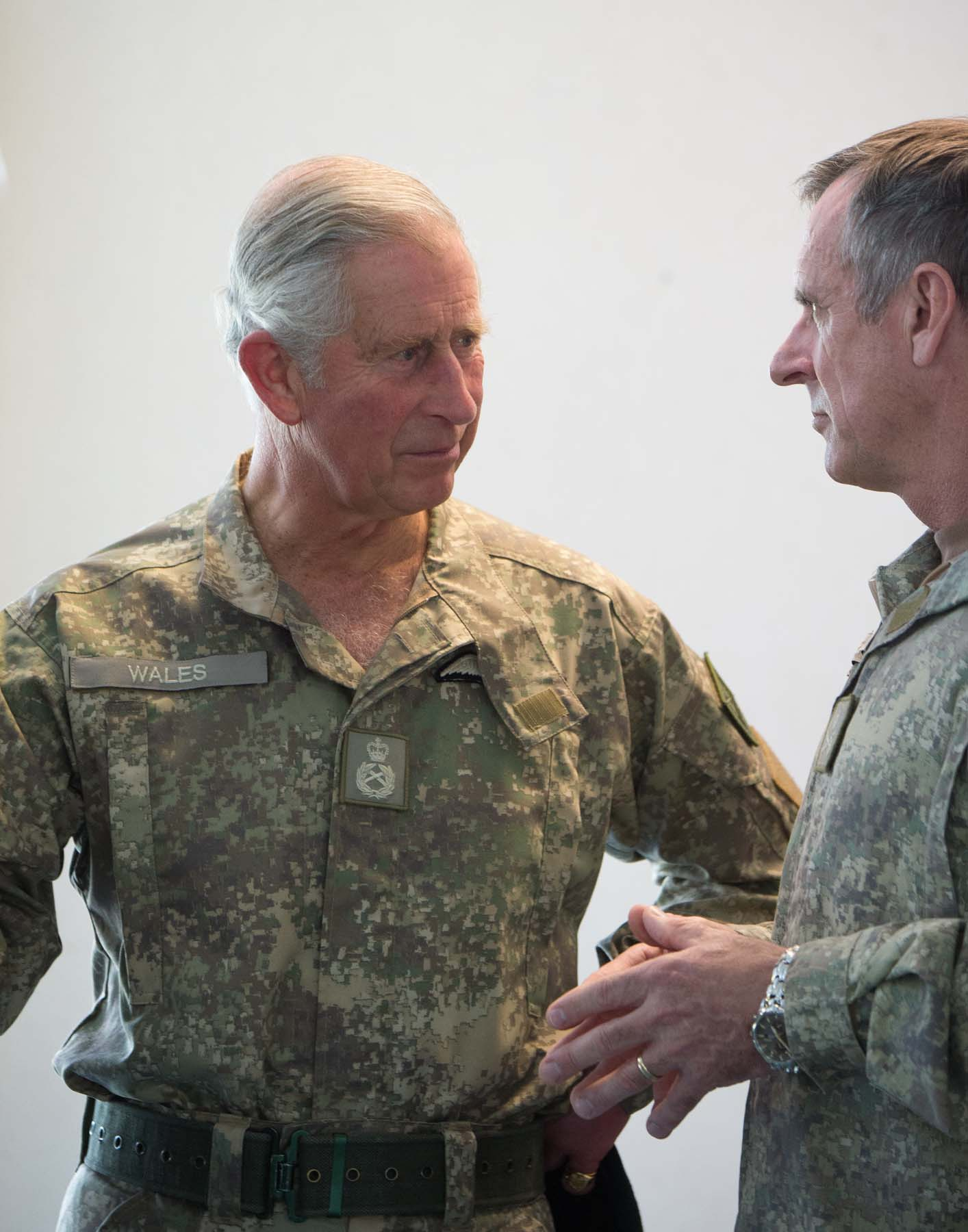
King Charles III in the combat uniform of a New Zealand Army field marshal.

- 11 June 1977 - HRH Prince Philip, Duke of Edinburgh (1921–2021)
- 3 August 2015 - HM King Charles III (b. 1948)

== North Korea ==
- 1953 - Kim Il Sung (1912–1994)
- 1992 - O Chin-u (1917–1995)
- 1992 - Kim Jong Il (1941–2011)
- 1995 - Ri Ul-sol (1921–2015)
- 1995 - Choi Kwang (1918–1997)
- July 2012 - Kim Jong Un (b. 1984)
- April 2016 - Kim Yong-chun (1936–2018)
- April 2016 - Hyon Chol-hae (1934–2022)
- October 2020 - Ri Pyong-chol (b. 1948)
- October 2020 - Pak Jong-chon

== Ottoman Empire ==
- List of field marshals of the Ottoman Empire

== Pakistan ==
- 1958 - Ayub Khan (1907–1974)
- 20 May 2025 - Asim Munir (b. 1968)

== Peru ==
- List of Marshals of Peru

== Philippines ==
- 24 August 1936 - Douglas MacArthur (1880–1964)

== Poland ==
- List of Polish field marshals

== Portugal ==
- List of Marshals of Portugal

== Prussia ==
- List of Prussian field marshals

== Romania ==
- 1914 - HM King Ferdinand (1865–1927)
- 1927 (1940) - HM King Michael I (1921–2017)
- 1930 - HM King Carol II (1893–1953)
- 1930 - Alexandru Averescu (1859–1938)
- 1930 - Constantin Prezan (1861–1943)
- 21 August 1941 - Ion Antonescu (1882–1946)

== Russian Empire ==
- List of Russian field marshals

== Russian Federation ==
- 1997 - Igor Sergeyev (1938–2006)

== Saudi Arabia ==
- 1991 - HH Prince Khalid bin Sultan (b. 1949)
- Saleh Al-Muhaya (b. 1939)

== Saxony ==
- List of Saxon field marshals

== Serbia ==
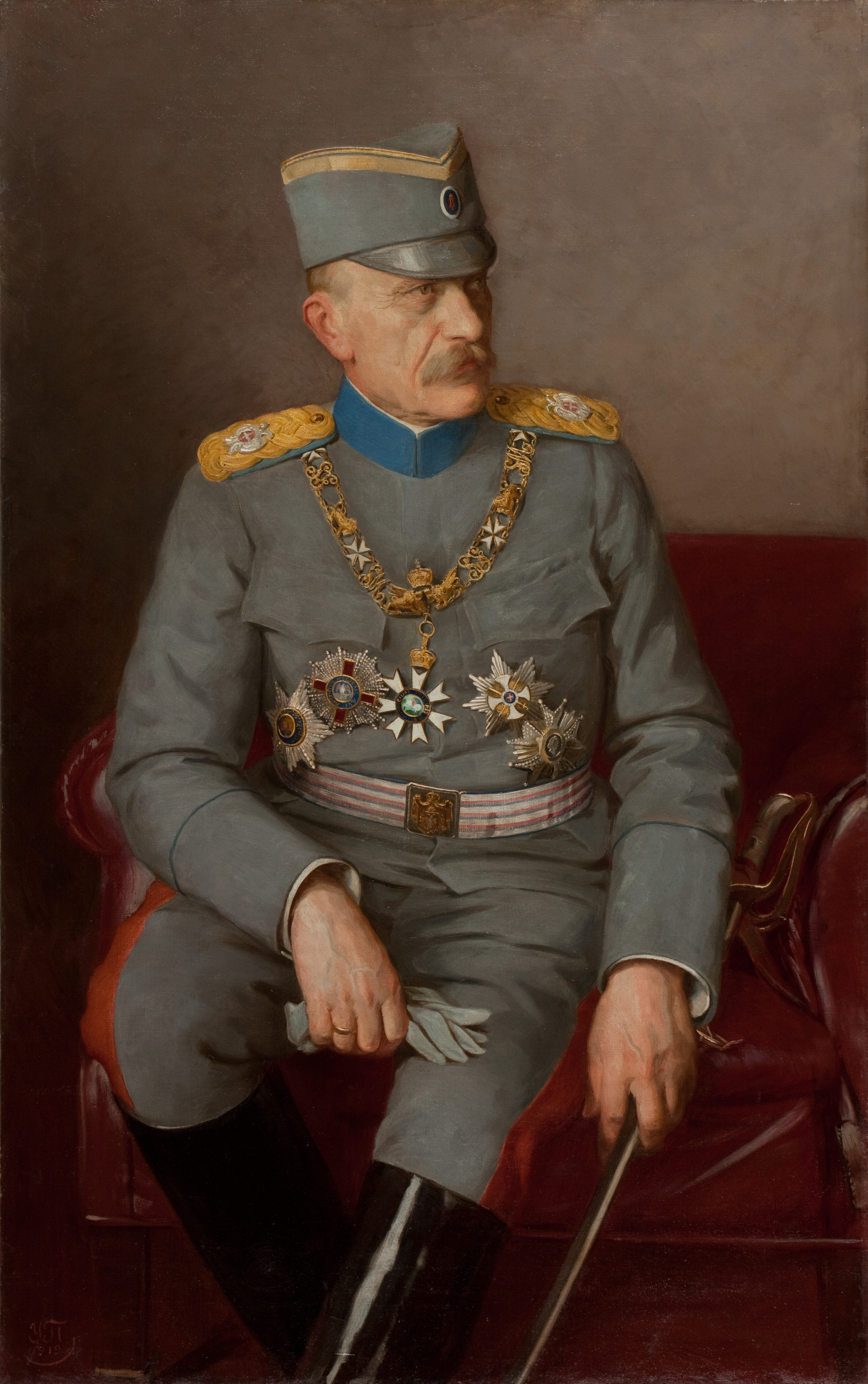
Živojin Mišić

- 14 January 1900 - HM King Milan I (1854–1901)
- 27 January 1901 - HM King Alexander I (1876–1903)
- 15 Jun 1903 - HM King Peter I (1844–1921)
- 20 October 1912 - Radomir Putnik (1847–1917)
- 20 August 1914 - Stepa Stepanović (1856–1929)
- 4 December 1914 - Živojin Mišić (1855–1921)
- 13 September 1918 - Petar Bojović (1858–1945)

== South Africa ==
- 24 May 1941 - Jan Smuts (1870–1950)

== Soviet Union ==
- List of Marshals of the Soviet Union

== Spain ==
- 1792 - Antonio Olaguer Feliú (1742–1813)
- 1810 - Henry Joseph O'Donnell, Count of La Bisbal (1769–1834)
- 1818 - Manuel Olaguer Feliú (1759–1824)
- 1844 - Ramón María Narváez y Campos, Duke of Valencia (1800–1868)
- 1869 - Juan Prim, Marquis of Los Castillejos (1814–1870)

== Sri Lanka ==
- 22 March 2015 - Sarath Fonseka (b. 1950)

== Sudan ==
- Gaafar Nimeiry (1930–2009)
- Abdel Rahman Swar al-Dahab (1934–2018)
- Omar al-Bashir (b. 1944)

== Sweden ==
- List of Swedish field marshals

== Syria ==
- Husni al-Za'im (1897–1949)
- Bashar al-Assad (b. 1965)

== Thailand ==
- List of field marshals of Thailand

== Tunisia ==
- 14 August 1840 - HH Abu Abbas Ahmed I Pasha Bey (1806–1855)
- 7 August 1855 - HH Muhammed Pasha Bey (1811–1859)
- 10 December 1859 - HH Muhammed as-Sadiq Pasha Bey (1813–1882)
- 28 October 1882 - HH Ali III Pasha Bey (1817–1902)
- 11 June 1902 - HH Muhammad al-Hadi Pasha Bey (1855–1906)
- 11 May 1906 - HH Muhammed al-Nasir Pasha Bey (1855–1922)
- 10 July 1922 - HH Muhammad al-Habib Pasha Bey (1858–1929)
- 11 February 1929 - HH Ahmed II Pasha Bey (1862–1942)
- 19 June 1942 - HH Muhammad al-Munsif Pasha Bey (1881–1948)
- 15 May 1943 - HH Muhammed al-Amin Pasha Bey (1881–1962)

== Turkey ==
- 21 September 1921 - Mustafa Kemal Atatürk (1881–1938)
- 31 August 1922 - Fevzi Çakmak (1876–1950)

== Uganda ==
- 1975 - Idi Amin (1925–2003)

== United Kingdom ==
- List of British field marshals

== Venezuela ==
- 1824 - Antonio José de Sucre (1795–1830)

== Yemen ==
- 24 December 1997 - Ali Abdullah Saleh (1947–2017)

== Yemen Arab Republic ==
- Abdullah as-Sallal (1917–1994)

== Yugoslavia ==
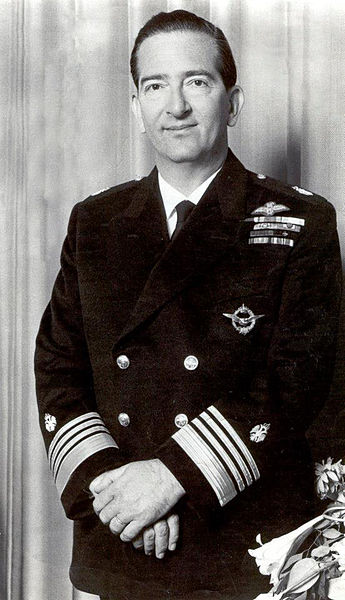
King Peter II of Yugoslavia

- Surviving Serbian field marshals retained their ranks in Yugoslavia.
- 16 August 1921 - HM King Alexander I (1888–1934)
- 9 October 1934 - HM King Peter II (1923–1970)
- 29 November 1943 - Josip Broz Tito (1892–1980)

== Zaire ==
- 1983 - Mobutu Sese Seko (1930–1997)

== Other countries ==
The rank also exists or has existed (on paper at least) in Bangladesh, Brunei, South Korea, Nigeria, Oman, and South Vietnam, but not all of these countries have used it.
