= Nabi Daniel Mosque =

Mosque in Alexandria, Egypt

Al-Nabi Daniyal Mosque
- مسجد النبي دانيال
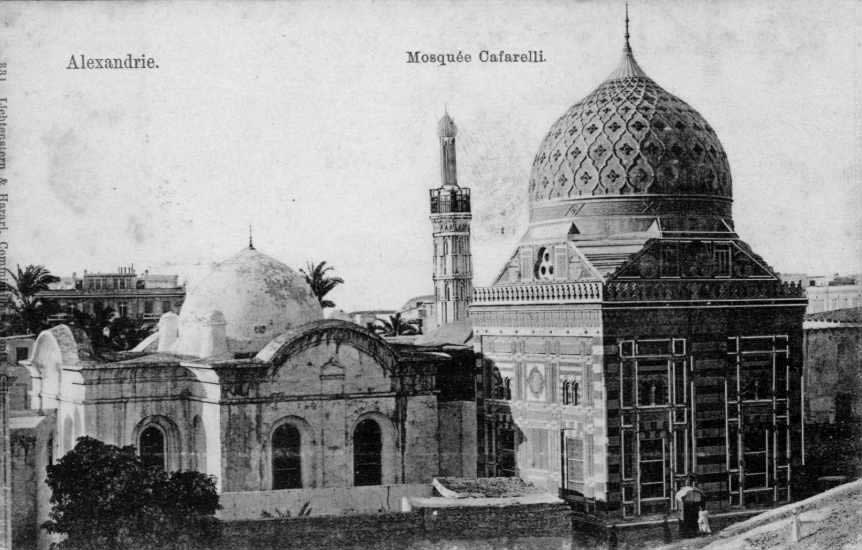
- The mosque in the 19th century

- Location of the mosque in the Nile Delta

Religion
- Affiliation: Sunni Islam
- Rite: Shafi'i
- Ecclesiastical or organisational status: Mosque; Mausoleum
- Status: Active

Location
- Location: Alexandria
- Country: Egypt
- Interactive map of Al-Nabi Daniyal Mosque
- Coordinates: 31°11′41″N 29°54′07″E

Architecture
- Type: Mosque
- Style: Neo-Mamluk
- Completed: 1790

Specifications
- Dome: 2
- Minaret: 1
- Shrines: 2: Muhammad Daniyal al-Mawsili; Luqman

The Nabi Daniel Mosque (Arabic: مسجد النبي دانيال), is a mosque and mausoleum, located in Alexandria, on the north coast of Egypt. The mosque was named in honour of Muhammad Daniyal al-Mawsili, a Kurdish Muslim scholar of the Shafi'i school who was buried in the mosque.

The mosque is one of the places speculated to once have been the Tomb of Alexander the Great, while the actual tomb in the crypt of the mosque is erroneously attributed to the biblical prophet Daniel.

== History ==
The building was built over the grave of the scholar Muhammad Daniyal al-Mawsili in 1790. In 1822, Muhammad Ali Pasha renovated and expanded the mosque. A royal cemetery for the family of the Khedive of Egypt was added next to the mosque.

In 1879, repairs to the stonework were performed within the basement of the Nabi Daniyal Mosque. An underground vault was accidentally uncovered. The stone worker, accompanied by one of the mosque's clerics, entered the vault. Monuments made of granite ending with an angular summit were found in the basement. When they had gone deeper, the cleric requested the worker to leave. After that, the entrance to the vault was walled up. Remains of a Muslim cemetery were also discovered.

== Architecture ==
The mosque building is a rectangular area surrounded by an open courtyard. In the northwestern side of the mosque, the ablution facilities are present. The male and female restrooms are also on the northwestern side of the courtyard.

The main entrance to the mosque is on the southwestern facade. This entrance leads to the prayer hall. The prayer hall is divided into two parts, one for males and the other one for females. The prayer hall itself is a rectangular area with eight corridors through seven marble columns bearing semicircular arches. In the southeastern wall of the prayer hall are the mihrab and minbar, and in the northeastern wall there is a door opening leading to the tomb chamber.

The tomb chamber is a rectangular area with an octagonal opening in the middle of its floor. A staircase leads at least five metres down into the basement, where two tombs are present. One of these tombs is that of the scholar, Muhammad Daniyal al-Mawsili, while the other tomb is attributed to Luqman, a man mentioned in the Qur'an, specifically the Surah Luqman. The authenticity of the tomb being attributed to Luqman is not confirmed by historians.

== Local legend ==
Local traditions relate that the tomb of the Prophet Daniel was found at the site of the mosque. During the Rashidun conquest of Egypt, a coffin was found, and when the coffin was opened, a body covered in shrouds studded in gold was found. The deceased had a long nose and long arms. The Caliph Umar affirmed the body to be that of Daniel, and ordered that it be reburied with full security. However, archaeologists disputed and debunked this story, saying that the entombed was the scholar Muhammad Daniyal al-Mawsili and not the Prophet.

== See also ==
- Islam in Egypt
- List of mosques in Alexandria
- List of mosques in Egypt
- Tomb of Daniel
- Tomb of Alexander the Great
