= Hassan Ismail Pasha =

Egyptian prince (1855–1888)

- Prince
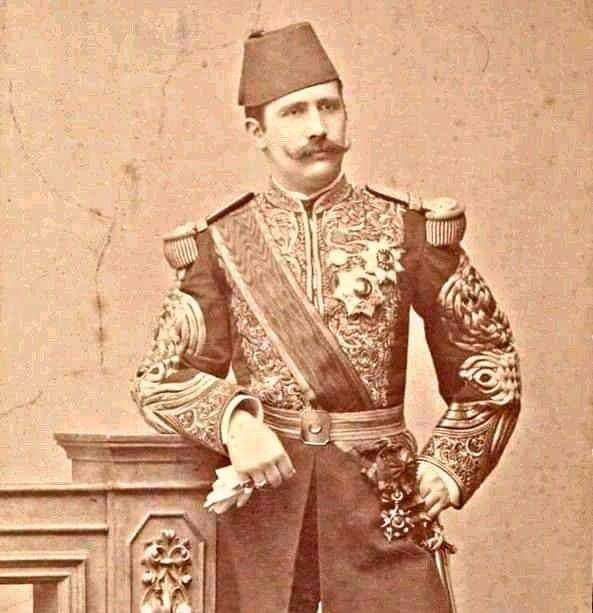
- Born: 1855; Cairo, Egypt Eyalet
- Died: 1888 (aged 32–33); Constantinople, Ottoman Empire
- Burial: Shrine of Prophet Daniel, Alexandria, Khedivate of Egypt
- Issue: Aziz
Names
- Egyptian Arabic: حسن باشا بن إسماعيل باشا بن إبراهيم باشا بن محمد علي باشا بن إبراهيم آغا بن عثمان آغا بن إبراهيم آغا العلوي.
- House: Muhammad Ali dynasty
- Father: Isma'il Pasha of Egypt
- Mother: Misl Melek Qadin
- Religion: Sunni Islam

Hassan Ismail Pasha (Egyptian Arabic: حسن إسماعيل باشا, romanized: Ḥasan Ismā‘īl Bāshā; 1855 – 22 March 1888) (Note: some sources say he was born 21 November 1853 or 1854) was an Egyptian prince and a member of the Muhammad Ali dynasty. He held the rank of Field Marshal of the Ottoman Empire.

== Biography ==
He was born in 1855 to Isma'il Pasha of Egypt and Misl Melek Qadin.

Hassan Pasha received the principles of languages and sciences in Egyptian schools, then his father sent him to Europe with his brothers, where he studied military arts.

When he returned to Egypt, his father appointed him as Commander-in-Chief of the Egyptian campaign against Ethiopia, and commander of the rescue team that the Egyptian government sent to help the Ottoman Empire in the Russo-Turkish War (1877–1878), where the Ottomans honored him with their medals.

When he returned to Egypt, his father celebrated his arrival with a lavish military celebration. After Khedive Ismail was deposed, Hassan Pasha traveled with his father to Italy, then his brother, Khedive Tawfiq Pasha, recruited him and sent him on a campaign to Sudan. When he completed his mission, he returned to Cairo, and from there to Constantinople, where Sultan Abdul Hamid II appointed him as his Yawar.

== Death ==
On March 22, 1888, Hassan Pasha died in Constantinople, and Sultan Abdul Hamid II issued an order to transport his body to Egypt in fulfillment of his will. He was transported to Alexandria on board a barge, where he was buried in the shrine of the Prophet Daniel.

He had one son named Aziz.
