= List of German field marshals =

Field marshal (German: Generalfeldmarschall) was usually the highest military rank in various German armed forces. It had existed, under slightly different names, in several German states since 1631. After the unification of Germany it was the highest military rank of the Imperial German Army and later in the Wehrmacht (Note: The Imperial German Navy and the Kriegsmarine used the rank of Grand Admiral (German: Großadmiral) instead.) (Note: In 1940 Hermann Göring was promoted to Reichsmarschall, a rank higher than that of field marshal and was the only one to hold this rank. This was done so as to make Göring superior to other field marshals and recognize him as the second man in Hitler's Reich.) until it was abolished in 1945.

The vast majority of the people promoted to field marshal won major battles in wars of their time. Field marshals played a compelling and influential role in military matters, were tax-exempt, members of the nobility, equal to government officials, under constant protection or escort, and had the right to directly report to the royal family. In the Prussian military tradition, which set the tone for the 19th century and the German Empire, field marshals could only be promoted in wartime and the royal family was excluded, both resulting in the creation of the rank of colonel general with the rank of general field marshal (German: Generaloberst mit dem Range eines Generalfeldmarschalls) in 1854. Both restrictions would eventually end with the first royals being promoted during the Franco-Prussian War in 1870, and later honorary promotions to foreign monarchs would follow. Adolf Hitler effectively disregarded the wartime prerequisite by two promotions in 1936 and 1938, though all subsequent promotions were during wartime.

== Electorate (1356–1806) and Kingdom of Saxony (1806–1918) ==
Name	Date of promotion	Birth and Death	Portrait	Reference
Hans Georg von Arnim-Boitzenburg	21 June 1631	1583–1641		
Francis Albert of Saxe-Lauenburg	24 November 1632	1598–1642		
Rudolf Graf von Marzin	19 October 1638	1585–1645		
Ernst Albrecht von Eberstein	1 January 1666	1605–76		
Joachim Rüdiger of Goltz	28 August 1681	1620–88		
Heino Heinrich Graf von Flemming	8 September 1688	1632–1706		
Hans Adam von Schöning	9 April 1691	1641–96		
Jeremias of Chauvet	10 May 1693	Unknown–1699	—	
Heinrich VI Reuß zu Obergreiz	30 September 1697	1649–97		
Adam Heinrich von Steinau	27 August 1699	Unknown–1712	—	
Georg Benedikt von Ogilvy	3 December 1706	1651–1710		
Jacob Heinrich von Flemming	22 February 1712	1667–1728		
Christoph August of Wackerbarth	17 April 1730	1662–1734		
Johann Adolf II, Duke of Saxe-Weissenfels	26 November 1735	1685–1746		
Frederick Augustus Rutowsky	11 January 1749	1702–64		
Johann Georg, Chevalier de Saxe	27 July 1763	1704–74		
Frederick of Anhalt-Dessau	6 January 1775	1705–81		
Albert of Saxony	11 July 1871	1828–1902		
Georg of Saxony	14 June 1888	1832–1904		

== Electorate (1623–1806) and Kingdom of Bavaria (1806–1918) ==
Name	Date of promotion	Birth and Death	Portrait	Reference
Johann Jakob von Anholt	30 May 1622	1599–1645		
Gottfried von Pappenheim	3 December 1630	1594–1632		
Johann von Götzen	26 January 1636	1582–1630		
Joachim Christian von Wahl	29 May 1640	1590–1644		
Franz von Mercy	31 May 1643	1597–1645		
Gottfried Huyn von Geleen	28 September 1645	1598–1657		
Jost Maximilian von Bronckhorst	29 August 1647	1598–1662		
Johann von Reuschenberg	30 January 1648	1603–1660		
Adrian von Enkevort	11 July 1648	1603–1663		
Philip Florinus of Sulzbach	28 March 1675	1630–1703		
Jean Baptist, Comte d'Arco	14 September 1702	1650–1715		
Friedrich Heinrich von Seckendorff	22 May 1742	1673–1763		
Karl Philipp von Wrede	7 March 1817	1767–1838		
Prince Karl Theodor of Bavaria	17 January 1841	1795–1875		
Prince Leopold of Bavaria	1 January 1905	1846–1930		
Rupprecht, Crown Prince of Bavaria	1 August 1916	1869–1955		

== Brandenburg-Prussia and the Kingdom of Prussia (1701–1870) ==
Name	Date of promotion	Birth and Death	Portrait	Reference
Otto Christoph von Sparr	20 June 1657	1599–1668		
John George II, Prince of Anhalt-Dessau	24 January 1670	1627–93		
Georg von Derfflinger	18 February 1670	1606–95		
Alexander Hermann, Count of Wartensleben	23 March 1706	1650–1734		
Leopold I, Prince of Anhalt-Dessau	1712	1676–1747		
Carl Philipp, Reichsgraf von Wylich und Lottum	1713	1650–1719		
Alexander zu Dohna-Schlobitten	1713	1661–1728		
Dubislav Gneomar von Natzmer	1728	1654–1739		
Albrecht Konrad Finck von Finckenstein	1733	1660–1735		
Friedrich Wilhelm von Grumbkow	1737	1678–1739		
Kurt Christoph Graf von Schwerin	1740	1684–1757		
Caspar Otto von Glasenapp	1741	1664–1747		
Samuel von Schmettau	1741	1684–1751		
Christian August, Prince of Anhalt-Zerbst	16 May 1742	1690–1747		
Leopold II, Prince of Anhalt-Dessau	17 May 1742	1700–51		
Friedrich Wilhelm von Dossow	15 January 1745	1669–1758		
Henning Alexander von Kleist	24 May 1747	1677–1749		
Christoph Wilhelm von Kalckstein	24 May 1747	1682–1759		
Dietrich of Anhalt-Dessau	24 May 1747	1702–69		
James Francis Edward Keith	18 September 1747	1696–1758		
Hans von Lehwaldt	1751	1685–1768		
Prince Moritz of Anhalt-Dessau	1757	1712–60		
Duke Ferdinand of Brunswick-Wolfenbüttel	15 November 1758	1721–92		
Charles William Ferdinand, Duke of Brunswick	1787	1735–1806		
Wichard Joachim Heinrich von Möllendorf	1793	1724–1816		
Alexander von Knobelsdorff	20 May 1798	1723–99		
Ludwig Karl von Kalckstein	21 May 1798	1725–1800		
Friedrich Adolf Graf von Kalckreuth	July 1807	1737–1818		
Wilhelm René de l'Homme de Courbière	July 1807	1733–1811		
Gebhard Leberecht von Blücher	19 October 1813	1742–1819		
Arthur Wellesley, 1st Duke of Wellington	15 November 1818	1769–1852		
Friedrich Graf Kleist von Nollendorf	1821	1762–1823		
Ludwig Yorck von Wartenburg	1821	1759–1830		
August Neidhardt von Gneisenau	1825	1760–1831		
Hans Ernst Karl, Graf von Zieten	1839	1770–1848		
Karl Freiherr von Müffling	5 October 1847	1775–1851		
Hermann von Boyen	7 October 1847	1771–1848		
Karl Friedrich von dem Knesebeck	9 October 1847	1768–1848		
Karl Friedrich Emil zu Dohna-Schlobitten	14 March 1854	1784–1859		
Friedrich Graf von Wrangel	5 August 1856	1784–1877		
Prince Friedrich Karl of Prussia	28 October 1870	1828–85		
Prince Frederick William of Prussia	28 October 1870	1831–88		

== German Empire (1871–1918) ==
Name	Date of promotion	Birth and Death	Portrait	Reference
Karl Eberhard Herwarth von Bittenfeld	8 April 1871	1796–1884		
Karl Friedrich von Steinmetz	8 April 1871	1796–1877		
Helmuth Karl Bernhard von Moltke	16 June 1871	1800–91		
Albert, Crown Prince of Saxony	11 July 1871	1828–1902		
Albrecht von Roon	1 January 1873	1803–79		
Edwin Freiherr von Manteuffel	19 September 1873	1809–85		
Leonhard Graf von Blumenthal	15 March 1888	1810–1900		
Georg, Crown Prince of Saxony	15 March 1888	1832–1904		
Prince Albert of Prussia	19 June 1888	1837–1906		
Archduke Albrecht, Duke of Teschen	19 June 1888	1817–95		
Franz Joseph I of Austria	27 February 1895	1830–1916		
Alfred von Waldersee	6 May 1900	1832–1904		
Gottlieb Graf von Haeseler	1 January 1905	1836–1919		
Wilhelm von Hahnke	1 January 1905	1833–1912		
Walter von Loë	1 January 1905	1828–1908		
Prince Arthur, Duke of Connaught and Strathearn	9 September 1906 (Note: Until 1915)	1850–1942		
Carol I of Romania	20 April 1909	1839–1914		
Alfred von Schlieffen	1 January 1911	1833–1913		
George V of the United Kingdom	16 May 1911	1865–1936		
Constantine I of Greece	8 August 1911	1868–1923		
Paul von Hindenburg	2 November 1914	1847–1934		
Karl von Bülow	27 January 1915	1846–1921		
Archduke Friedrich, Duke of Teschen	22 June 1915	1856–1936		
August von Mackensen	22 June 1915	1849–1945		
Ludwig III of Bavaria	26 June 1915	1845–1921		
Franz Conrad von Hötzendorf	1916	1852–1925		
Ferdinand I of Bulgaria	18 January 1916	1861–1948		
Mehmed V of the Ottoman Empire	1 February 1916	1844–1918		
William II of Württemberg	23 July 1916	1848–1921		
Rupprecht, Crown Prince of Bavaria	1 August 1916	1869–1955		
Prince Leopold of Bavaria	1 August 1916	1846–1930		
Albrecht, Duke of Württemberg	1 August 1916	1865–1939		
Charles I of Austria	12 February 1917	1887–1922		
Hermann von Eichhorn	18 December 1917	1848–1918		
Remus von Woyrsch	18 December 1917	1847–1920		

== Weimar Republic (1918–33) ==
After the loss of the First World War, Germany was transformed into what became known as the Weimar Republic, which was subject to the terms of the Treaty of Versailles. The military restrictions imposed by the treaty required the reduction of the German Army to 100,000 men, a reduction of the German Navy, and the abolition of the German Air Force. As a result of the new military arrangements, there were no field marshals created during the Weimar Republic.

== Nazi Germany (1933–45) ==
Portrait	Name	Date of promotion	Branch	Ref.
Werner von Blomberg	Werner von Blomberg (1878–1946)	20 April 1936	German Army	
Hermann Göring	Hermann Göring (1893–1946)	4 February 1938	Luftwaffe	
Fedor von Bock	Fedor von Bock (1880–1945)	19 July 1940	German Army	
Walther von Brauchitsch	Walther von Brauchitsch (1881–1948)	19 July 1940	German Army	
Albert Kesselring	Albert Kesselring (1885–1960)	19 July 1940	Luftwaffe	
Wilhelm Keitel	Wilhelm Keitel (1882–1946)	19 July 1940	German Army	
Günther von Kluge	Günther von Kluge (1882–1944)	19 July 1940	German Army	
Wilhelm Ritter von Leeb	Wilhelm Ritter von Leeb (1876–1956)	19 July 1940	German Army	
Wilhelm List	Wilhelm List (1880–1971)	19 July 1940	German Army	
Erhard Milch	Erhard Milch (1892–1972)	19 July 1940	Luftwaffe	
Walter von Reichenau	Walter von Reichenau (1884–1942)	19 July 1940	German Army	
Gerd von Rundstedt	Gerd von Rundstedt (1875–1953)	19 July 1940	German Army	
Hugo Sperrle	Hugo Sperrle (1885–1953)	19 July 1940	Luftwaffe	
Erwin von Witzleben	Erwin von Witzleben (1881–1944)	19 July 1940	German Army	
Eduard von Böhm-Ermolli	Eduard von Böhm-Ermolli (1856–1941)	31 October 1940	German Army	
Erwin Rommel	Erwin Rommel (1891–1944)	22 June 1942	German Army	
Georg von Küchler	Georg von Küchler (1881–1968)	30 June 1942	German Army	
Erich von Manstein	Erich von Manstein (1887–1973)	1 July 1942	German Army	
Friedrich Paulus	Friedrich Paulus (1890–1957)	31 January 1943	German Army	
Ernst Busch	Ernst Busch (1885–1945)	1 February 1943	German Army	
Paul Ludwig Ewald von Kleist	Paul Ludwig Ewald von Kleist (1881–1954)	1 February 1943	German Army	
Maximilian von Weichs	Maximilian von Weichs (1881–1954)	1 February 1943	German Army	
Wolfram Freiherr von Richthofen	Wolfram Freiherr von Richthofen (1895–1945)	16 February 1943	Luftwaffe	
Walter Model	Walter Model (1891–1945)	1 March 1944	German Army	
Ferdinand Schörner	Ferdinand Schörner (1892–1973)	5 April 1945	German Army	
Robert Ritter von Greim	Robert Ritter von Greim (1892–1945)	25 April 1945	Luftwaffe	

== See also ==
- Field marshal (United Kingdom)
- Field marshal (Russia)
- Fältmarskalk
  - List of Swedish field marshals
- List of German colonel generals

== Sources ==
- Alexeevna, Yekaterina (2007). The Memoirs of Catherine the Great. Random House Publishing. ISBN 978-0307432438.
- Alford, Kenneth D. (2003). Nazi Plunder: Great Treasure Stories of World War II. Da Capo Press. ISBN 978-0306820908.
- Ballard, Richard (2011). A New Dictionary of the French Revolution. I.B. Tauris Publishing. ISBN 978-1848854659.
- Bayerische, Staatsbibliothek (1861). Die Generale des k bayerischen Heeres seit 1 Januar 1800 (in German). München.
- Biesinger, Joseph A. (2006). Germany: A Reference Guide from the Renaissance to the Present. Facts on File Publishing. ISBN 978-0816045211.
- Blumberg, Arnold (1990). Carefully Planned Accident: The Italian War of 1859. Associated University. ISBN 978-0945636076.
- Breuer, William B. (2002). Daring Missions of World War II. John Wiley & Sons Publishing. ISBN 978-0471150879.
- Browne, John (2013). Hidden Account of the Romanovs. Universe Publishing. ISBN 978-1475978346.
- Bruce, Phillip A.; Stanard, William G., eds. (1958). The Virginia Magazine of History and Biography. California University. OCLC 1642879.
- Burke, Edmund (2012). The Annual Register, Or, A View of the History and Politics of the Year 1802. California University. ISBN 978-1276653947.
- Carlyle, Thomas (2002). Historical Essays. California University. ISBN 978-0520220614.
- Chisholm, Hugh; Garvin, James L., eds. (1926). The Encyclopædia Britannica: a Dictionary of Arts, Sciences, Literature & General Information. Cambridge University. LCCN 11027773.
- Citino, Robert M. (2005). The German Way of War: From the Thirty Years' War to the Third Reich. Kansas University. ISBN 0-7006-1410-9.
- Clarke, Christopher (2000). Kaiser Wilhelm II. Longman Publishing. ISBN 0-582-24559-1.
- Colby, Frank M.; Williams, Talcott, eds. (1906). The New International Encyclopaedia. Michigan University. OCLC 16690620.
- Debrett, John (1836). Debrett's Peerage of England, Scotland and Ireland. Oxford University. ISBN 978-1130532470.
- Droysen, Johann G. (1996). Das Leben des Feldmarschalls Grafen York von Wartenburg [The Life of Field Marshal Count York von Wartenberg]. Phaidon Publishing. ISBN 3-88851-160-7.
- Ehlert, Hans (2014). The Schlieffen Plan: International Perspectives on the German Strategy for World War I. Kentucky University. ISBN 978-0813147475.
- Frankel, Benjamin (2004). History in Dispute: The Spanish Civil War. St. James Publishing. ISBN 978-1558624948.
- Fellgiebel, Walther-Peer (2000). Die Trager Des Ritterkreuzes Des Eisernen Kreuzes, 1939–1945 [The Carriers of the Knight's Cross of the Iron Cross, 1939-1945]. Podzun-Pallas Publishing. ISBN 978-3-7909-0284-6.
- Friedländer, Ernst (1882). Allgemeine Deutsche Biographie [General German Biography]. Duncker & Humblot Publishing. LCCN 01013117.
- Glozier, Matthew; Onnekink, David, eds. (2007). War, Religion and Service: Huguenot Soldiering, 1685-1713. Ashgate Publishing. ISBN 978-1851098798.
- Gneisenau, August W. A.; Marston, James E., eds. (1815). The Life and Campaigns of Field Marshal Prince Blücher of Wahlstatt. New York's Public Library. OCLC 03142316.
- Goldensohn, Leon (2010). The Nuremberg Interviews: Conversations with the Defendants and Witnesses. Random House Publishing. ISBN 978-1409078449.
- Gruyter, Walter D. (2006). Dictionary of German Biography. K. G. Saur Publishing. ISBN 978-3110961164.
- Guthrie, William P. (2003). The Later Thirty Years War: From the Battle of Wittstock to the Peace of Westphalia. Greenwood Publishing. ISBN 978-0313324086.
- Hahnke, Robert V. (2012). Monument From the Kaiser. AuthorHouse Publishing. ISBN 978-1477289754.
- Hakim, Joy (1995). A History of Us: War, Peace and all that Jazz. Oxford University. ISBN 0-19-509514-6.
- Hargreaves, Richard (2010). Blitzkrieg Unleashed: The German Invasion of Poland, 1939. Stackpole Books. ISBN 978-0811707244.
- Heal, Sid (2012). Field Command. Lantern Books. ISBN 978-1590563557.
- Heilmann, Johann von (1868). Kriegsgeschichte von Bayern, Franken, Pfalz und Schwaben von 1506 bis 1651 (in German). Tübingen: Literarisch-artistische Anstalt (G.J. Cotta).
- Hughes, Daniel (2009). Moltke on the Art of War: Selected Writings. Random House Publishing. ISBN 978-0307538512.
- Irmer, Georg (2005). Hans Georg von Arnim. Harvard University. ISBN 978-1142131623.
- Jensen, Tim; Rothstein, Mikael, eds. (1958). Secular Theories on Religion: Current Perspectives. Museum Tusculanum Publishing. ISBN 978-8772895727.
- Johannes Kunisch (2004). Friedrich der Grosse. Der König und seine Zeit [Friedrich the Great. The King and His Time]. C.H. Beck Publishing. ISBN 3-406-52209-2.
- König, Anton B. (1789). Biographisches Lexikon aller Helden und Militärpersonen [Biographies of Heroes and Military Personnel]. Princeton University. OCLC 34794450.
- Kershaw, Ian (2008). Hitler: A Biography. W. W. Norton & Company. ISBN 978-0-393-06757-6.
- Kesselring, Albert (1970). A Soldier's Record. Greenwood Publishing. ISBN 0-8371-2975-3.
- Large, David C. (2007). Berlin. Basic Books. ISBN 978-0465010127.
- Fischer, Paul (1907). Feste Graudienz 1807 unter Gouverneur de Courbiere - Geschichte der Blockade und Belagerung (PDF) (in German). Graudenz: Verlag Arnold Kriedte.
- Leggiere, Michael V. (2014). Blücher: Scourge of Napoleon. Oklahoma University. ISBN 978-0806144092.
- Long, George (1844). The Biographical Dictionary of the Society for the Diffusion of Useful Knowledge. Virginia University. OCLC 18067040.
- Lund, Erik A (1999). War For the Every Day: Generals, Knowledge, and Warfare In Early Modern Europe, 1680-1740. Greenwood Publishing. ISBN 978-0-313-31041-6.
- MacDonogh, Giles (2001). Frederick the Great: A Life in Deed and Letters. St. Martin's Griffin Publishing. ISBN 0-312-27266-9.
- MacKillop, Andrew; Murdoch, Steve, eds. (2003). Military Governors and Imperial Frontiers C. 1600-1800: A Study of Scotland and Empires. Brill Academic Publishing. ISBN 978-9004129702.
- Maitland, William F. (1762). The London Chronicle. Michigan University. OCLC 85557971.
- Marrs, Jim (2010). The Sisterhood of the Rose: The Recollection of Celeste Levesque. Red Wheel Weiser Publishing. ISBN 978-1934708521.
- Matthews, Rupert (2013). Stalingrad. Arcturus Publishing. ISBN 978-1782122586.
- März, Stefan (2013). Das Haus Wittelsbach im Ersten Weltkrieg: Chance und Zusammenbruch monarchischer Herrschaft. Pustet. ISBN 978-3-79172-497-3.
- Mineau, André (2004). Operation Barbarossa: Ideology and Ethics Against Human Dignity. Rodopi Publishing. ISBN 978-9042016330.
- Mitcham, Samuel W. (2007). Rommel's Lieutenants: The Men who Served the Desert Fox, France, 1940. Greenwood Publishing. ISBN 978-0275991852.
- Muffling, Karl F. V. (1997). The Memoirs of Baron von Müffling: A Prussian Officer In the Napoleonic Wars. Michigan University. ISBN 978-1853672736.
- Murad, Anatol (1968). Franz Joseph I of Austria and His Empire. Twayne Publishing. LCCN 68-172333.
- Ohm, Helen; Boehlke, Audrey; Boehlke, LeRoy, eds. (1997). Pomeranian Culture and Genealogy. Wisconsin University. ISBN 3-87585-392-X.
- Paret, Peter; Morgan, Mark, eds. (2014). Carl von Clausewitz: Historical and Political Writings. Princeton University. ISBN 978-1400862160.
- Parkinson, Roger (2000). Hussar General: The Life of Blucher, Man of Waterloo. Wordsworth Editions. ISBN 978-1840222531.
- Pawly, Ronald (2012). The Kaiser's Warlords: German Commanders of World War One. Osprey Publishing. ISBN 978-1780966304.
- Phillips, Lawrence B. (1871). The Dictionary of Biographical Reference. Oxford University. OCLC 1532621.
- Pope, Stephen; Wheal, Elizabeth-Anne, eds. (2007). Dictionary of the First World War. Pen & Sword Publishing. ISBN 978-1473813618.
- Röhl, John (1996). The Kaiser and His Court: Wilhelm II and the Government of Germany. Cambridge University. ISBN 978-0521565042.
- Reynolds, Michael A. (2011). Shattering Empires: The Clash and Collapse of the Ottoman and Russian Empires 1908–1918. Cambridge University. ISBN 978-1139494120.
- Riley, Jonathan P. (2013). Napoleon and the World War of 1813: Lessons in Coalition Warfighting. Routledge Publishing. ISBN 978-1136321351.
- Riley, Jonathon (2014). Decisive Battles: From Yorktown to Operation Desert Storm. Bloomsbury Publishing. ISBN 978-1441126740.
- Roberts, Priscilla; Tucker, Spencer, eds. (2005). World War I: A Student Encyclopedia. ABC-CLIO. ISBN 978-1851098798.
- Ross, Hartmut (1997). Moritz Prinz von Anhalt-Dessau, Neue Deutsche Biographie [Moritz Prinz von Anhalt-Dessau, New German Biography]. Duncker & Humblot Publishing. ISBN 3-428-00199-0.
- Rothenburg, Gunther E. (1976). The Army of Francis Joseph. Purdue University. ISBN 0-91119-841-5.
- Samuel W., Samuel W. (2003). Retreat to the Reich. Stackpole Books. ISBN 978-0811733847.
- Sandler, Stanley (2002). Ground Warfare: An International Encyclopedia. ABC-CLIO. ISBN 978-1576073445.
- Schmidt-Brentano, Antonio (2006). Kaiserliche und k.k. Generale (1618-1815) (PDF) (in German). München: Österreichisches Staatsarchiv.
- Siborne, William (1895). The Waterloo Campaign, 1815. Harvard University. OCLC 13772354.
- Siebigk, Ferdinand (1883). Allgemeine Deutsche Biographie [General German Biography]. Duncker & Humblot Publishing. LCCN 01013117.
- Snyder, Louis (1976). Encyclopedia of the Third Reich. Da Capo Press. ISBN 978-1-56924-917-8.
- Steinberg, Jonathan (2011). Bismarck: A Life. Oxford University. ISBN 978-0199845439.
- Stoker, Donald (2014). Clausewitz: His Life and Work. Oxford University. ISBN 978-0199357963.
- Tague, James E. (2011). The Last Field Marshal. Author Solutions. ISBN 978-145-683-185-1.
- Tucker, Spencer C. (2009). A Global Chronology of Conflict: From the Ancient World to the Modern Middle East. ABC-CLIO. ISBN 978-1851096725.
- Vatikiotis, Peter J. (2014). Popular Autocracy in Greece, 1936-1941: A Political Biography of General Ioannis Metaxas. Routledge Publishing. ISBN 978-1134729333.
- Veve, Thomas D. (1992). The Duke of Wellington and the British Army of Occupation in France, 1815-1818. Greenwood Publishing. ISBN 978-0307432438.
- Wawro, Geoffrey (1997). The Austro-Prussian War: Austria's War with Prussia and Italy in 1866. Cambridge University. ISBN 978-0521629515.
- Wheatcroft, Andrew; Keegan, John, eds. (2007). Who's Who in Military History: From 1453 to the Present Day. Routledge Publishing. ISBN 978-1136414169.
- Wheeler-Bennett, John (1967). The Nemesis of Power. Macmillan Publishing. OCLC 711310.
- Williamson, Gordon (2006). German Commanders of World War II. Osprey Publishing. ISBN 1-84176-597-X.
- Wistrich, Robert S. (1982). Who's Who in Nazi Germany. Value Publishing. ISBN 978-0-415-26038-1.
- Wood, James A. (2014). Army of the West. Stackpole Books. ISBN 978-0811741439.
- Wright, Mike (2009). What They Didn't Teach You About World War II. Random House Publishing. ISBN 978-0307549167.
