= Tomb of Alexander the Great =

Undiscovered tomb

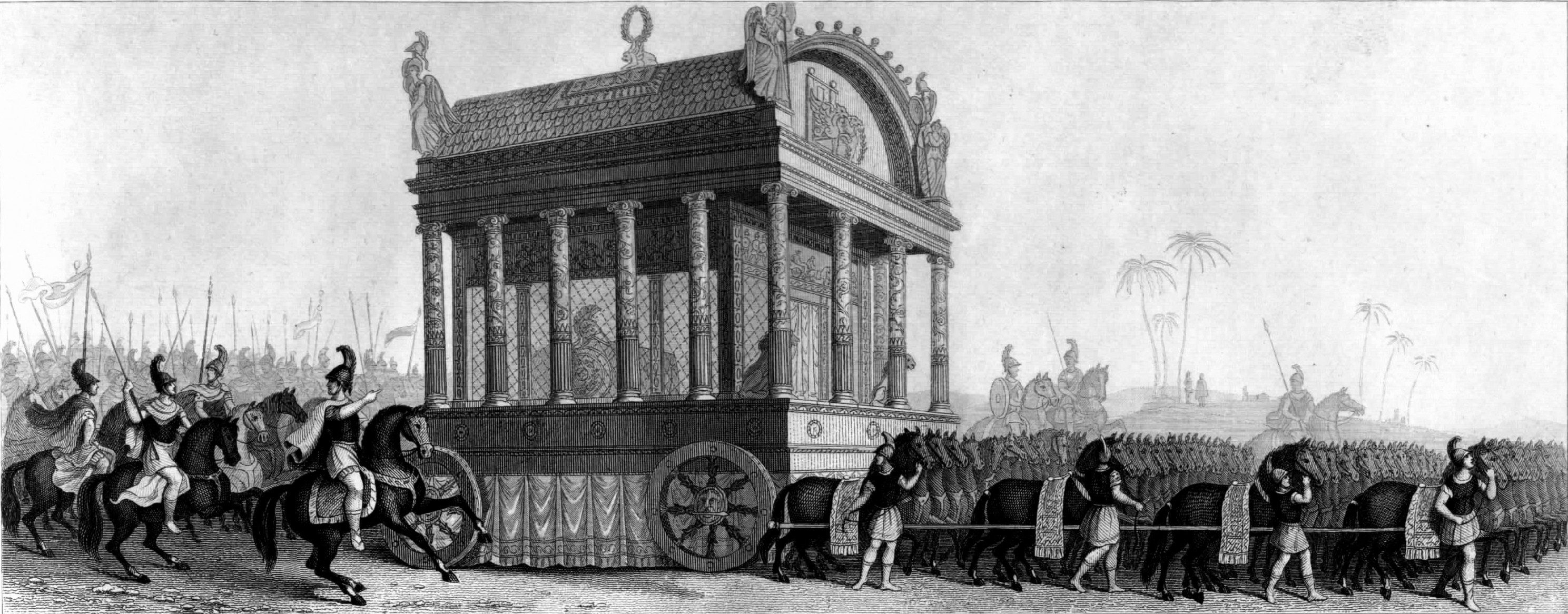
Alexander's carriage, according to Diodorus Siculus, 19th-century representation

The tomb of Alexander the Great is attested in several historical accounts, but its location remains an enduring mystery. Following Alexander's death in Babylon, his body was initially buried in Memphis by one of his generals, Ptolemy I Soter, before being transferred to Alexandria, Egypt, where it was reburied.

The Roman general Julius Caesar, Queen Cleopatra and Emperor Augustus, among others, are noted as having visited Alexander's tomb in Alexandria in antiquity. Its later fate is unknown, and it had possibly been destroyed by the 4th or 5th centuries. Since the 19th century, over one hundred official attempts have been made to try to identify the site of Alexander's tomb in Alexandria.

== Background ==
According to Quintus Curtius Rufus and Justin, Alexander asked shortly before his death to be interred in the temple of Zeus Ammon at Siwa Oasis. Alexander, who requested to be referred to and perceived as the son of Zeus Ammon, did not wish to be buried alongside his actual father at Aegae. Alexander's body was placed in a coffin of "hammered gold", according to Diodorus, which was "fitted to the body". The coffin is also mentioned by Strabo and Curtius Rufus (subsequently, in 89–90 BC the golden coffin was melted down and replaced with that of glass or crystal).

The possession of his body became a subject of negotiations between Perdiccas, Ptolemy I Soter, and Seleucus I Nicator.

Alexander's wish to be interred in Siwa was not honored. In 321 BC, on its way back to Macedonia, the funerary cart with Alexander's body was hijacked in Syria by one of Alexander's generals, Ptolemy I Soter. In late 322 or early 321 BC, Ptolemy diverted the body to Egypt where it was interred in Memphis, the center of Alexander's government in Egypt. While Ptolemy was in possession of Alexander's body, Perdiccas and Eumenes had Alexander's armor, diadem and royal scepter.

According to Plutarch, who visited Alexandria, Python of Catana and Seleucus were sent to a serapeum to ask the oracle whether Alexander's body should be sent to Alexandria and the oracle answered positively. In the late 4th or early 3rd century BC, Alexander's body was transferred from the Memphis tomb to Alexandria for reburial (by Ptolemy Philadelphus in c. 280 BC, according to Pausanias). Later, Ptolemy Philopator placed Alexander's body in Alexandria's communal mausoleum. According to Strabo, the mausoleum was called the Soma, from the Greek σῶμα which means "body". It is also called the Sema, from the Greek σῆμα meaning "grave sign or marker", by modern historians through the connection of the two concepts and the similarities of the words. By 274 BC, Alexander was already entombed in Alexandria. His tomb became the focal point for the Ptolemaic cult of Alexander the Great.

== Historical attestations ==
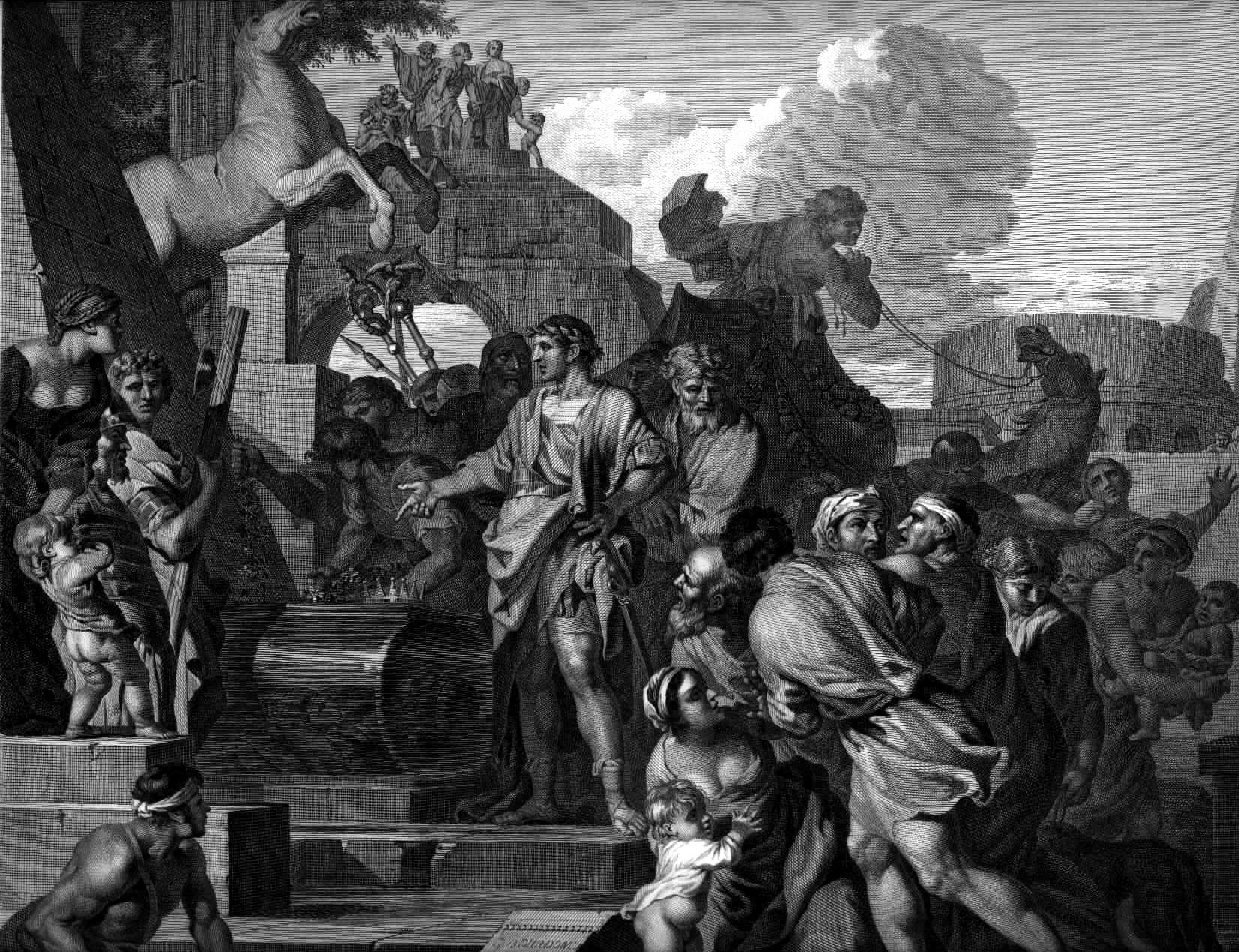
Augustus during his visit to Alexander's tomb, painted by Sébastien Bourdon in 1643

According to Pausanias and the contemporary Parian Chronicle records for the years 321–320 BC, Ptolemy initially buried Alexander in Memphis. In the late 4th or early 3rd century BC, during the early Ptolemaic dynasty, Alexander's body was transferred from Memphis to Alexandria, where it was reburied.

In 61 BC, during the triumph of Pompey the Great, Appian related that "Pompey himself was borne in a chariot studded with gems, wearing, it is said, the cloak of Alexander the Great, if anyone can believe that. It seems to have been found among the possessions of Mithridates that the inhabitants of Kos had received from Cleopatra III of Egypt."

In 48 BC, Alexander's tomb in Alexandria was visited by Julius Caesar. To finance her war against Octavian, Cleopatra VII took gold from the tomb. Shortly after the death of Cleopatra, Alexander's resting place was visited by Augustus, who is said to have placed flowers on the tomb and a golden diadem upon Alexander's head. According to Suetonius, Alexander's tomb was then partially looted by Caligula, who reportedly removed his breastplate. In 199 AD, Alexander's tomb was sealed up by Septimius Severus during his visit to Alexandria. Later, in 215, some items from Alexander's tomb were relocated by Caracalla. According to chronicler John of Antioch, Caracalla removed his own tunic, ring and belt, along with some other precious items, and deposited them on the sarcophagus.

When John Chrysostom visited Alexandria in 400 AD, he asked to see Alexander's tomb and remarked, "his tomb even his own people know not". Conversely, around this same time, Cyril of Alexandria notes that the tomb was opened up by orders of the Emperor Theodosius I and looted. Later authors, such as Ibn 'Abd al-Hakam (b. 803), Al-Masudi (b. 896) and Leo the African (b. 1494), report having seen Alexander's tomb. Leo the African, who visited Alexandria as a young man, wrote: "In the midst of the ruins of Alexandria, there still remains a small edifice, built like a chapel, worthy of notice on account of a tomb; in which sepulchre, they assert, is preserved the body of Alexander the Great ... An immense crowd of strangers come thither, even from distant countries, for the sake of worshipping and doing homage to the tomb, on which they likewise frequently bestow considerable donations". George Sandys, who visited Alexandria in 1610, was reportedly shown a sepulchre there, venerated as the resting place of Alexander, although it is likely a mere repetition of the description given by Africanus.

== Present location ==
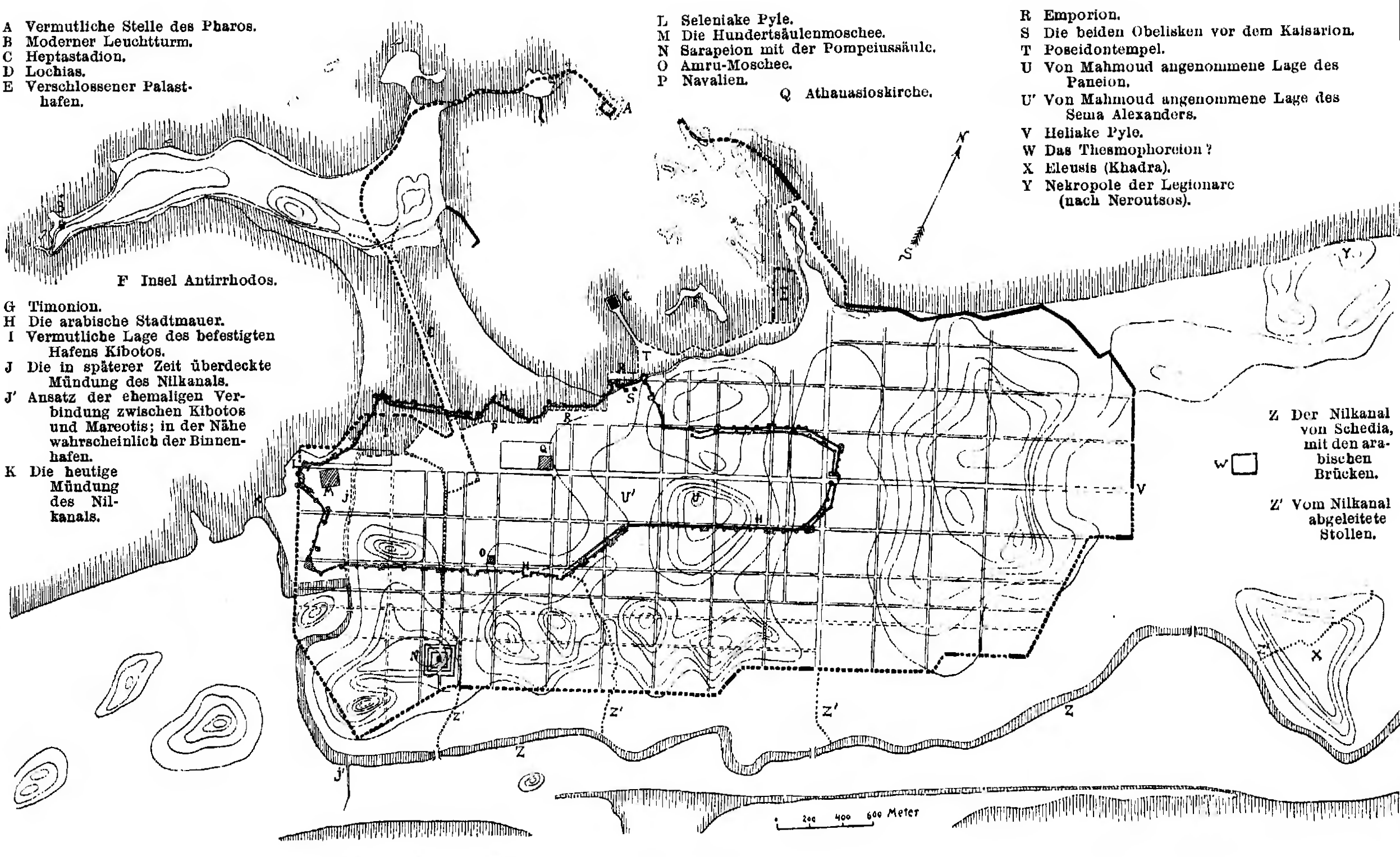
1893 map of Alexandria, with the location of ancient features marked

The Egyptian Supreme Council for Antiquities has officially recognized over 140 search attempts for Alexander's tomb. Mahmoud el-Falaki (1815–1885), who compiled the map of ancient Alexandria, believed Alexander's tomb is in the center of Alexandria, at the intersection of the Via Canopica (modern Horreya Avenue) and the ancient street labeled R5. Since then several other scholars such as Tasos Neroutsos, Heinrich Kiepert and Ernst von Sieglin placed the tomb in the same area. In 1850, Ambroise Schilizzi announced the discovery of alleged Alexander's mummy and tomb inside the Nabi Daniel Mosque in Alexandria. Later, in 1879, a stone worker accidentally broke through the vaulted chamber inside the basement of that mosque. Some granite monuments with an angular summit were discerned there, but the entrance was then walled up and the stone worker was asked not to disclose the incident. The image on a Roman lamp in the National Museum of Poznań and others at the British Museum and the Hermitage Museum are interpreted by some scholars as showing Alexandria with the Soma Mausoleum pictured as a building with a pyramidal roof. In 1888, Heinrich Schliemann attempted to locate Alexander's tomb within the Nabi Daniel Mosque, but he was denied permission to excavate.

In 1993, Triantafyllos Papazois developed the theory that it is not Philip II of Macedon who is buried in the royal tomb II at Vergina, Greece, but it is Alexander the Great together with his wife Roxanne, while his son Alexander IV is buried in tomb III. Also based on the ancient historical sources he came to the conclusion that the breastplate, the shield, the helmet and the sword found in tomb II belong to the armor of Alexander the Great.

In 1995, Greek archaeologist Liana Souvaltzi announced that she identified one alleged tomb in Siwa with that of Alexander. The claim was put in doubt by the then general secretary of the Greek Ministry of Culture, George Thomas, who said that it was unclear whether the excavated structure is even a tomb. Thomas and members of his team said that the style of the excavated object was not, as Souvaltzi contended, Macedonian, and that the fragments of tablets they were shown did not support any of the translations provided by Souvaltzi as proof of her finding.

According to one legend, the body lies in a crypt beneath an early Christian church.

In a 2011 episode of the National Geographic Channel television series Mystery Files, Andrew Chugg claimed that Alexander the Great's body was rebranded into Saint Mark the Evangelist and the tomb turned into a church by 392 AD to both save his remains and tomb while also christanizing them. The remains were then stolen from Alexandria, Egypt, in 828 AD by Venetian merchants who believed it to be that of Saint Mark the Evangelist, as the Caliph Al-Ma'mun had ordered the demolition of the church in order to recover building materials for new mosques. The merchants smuggled the remains to Venice, where they were then venerated as Saint Mark the Evangelist in St Mark's Basilica. In an article in the Egyptology journal Kmt (fall 2020), Chugg showed that a 3rd century BC fragment of a high status Macedonian tomb found embedded in the foundations of St Mark's Basilica in Venice in 1960 is an exact fit as part of a tomb-casing for the Sarcophagus of Nectanebo II in the British Museum, which was long venerated in Alexandria as Alexander's tomb.

Map of ancient Alexandria. Possible site of Alexander the Great tomb is # 7

The 2014 discovery of a large Alexander-era tomb in Amphipolis in the region of Macedonia, Greece, once again led to speculation about Alexander's final resting place. Some have speculated that it was built for Alexander but was not used due to Ptolemy I Soter having seized the funeral cortege. Based on findings unearthed at the site, the excavation team argued that the tomb was a memorial dedicated to Alexander's friend Hephaestion.

In 2019, a marble statue purported to be of Alexander was found by Greek archaeologist and director of the Hellenic Research Institute of Alexandrian Civilization, Calliope Limneos-Papakosta, in the Shallalat Gardens, which occupy the ancient royal quarter in Alexandria. In 2021, Egyptian officials claimed they had found Alexander the Great's tomb in Siwa Oasis, an urban area near the Libyan border with Egypt.

In 2024, Egyptologist Christian de Vartavan published his Locating the Tomb and Body of Alexander the Great, in which he suggests that the body of Alexander may have been placed in the Eastern Desert of Egypt to protect it from destruction.

== See also ==
- Tomb of Genghis Khan – location also unknown
- Alexander Sarcophagus, unrelated to Alexander's body, but adorned with motifs related to his life.
