= 1940 Field Marshal Ceremony =

German military promotion ceremony

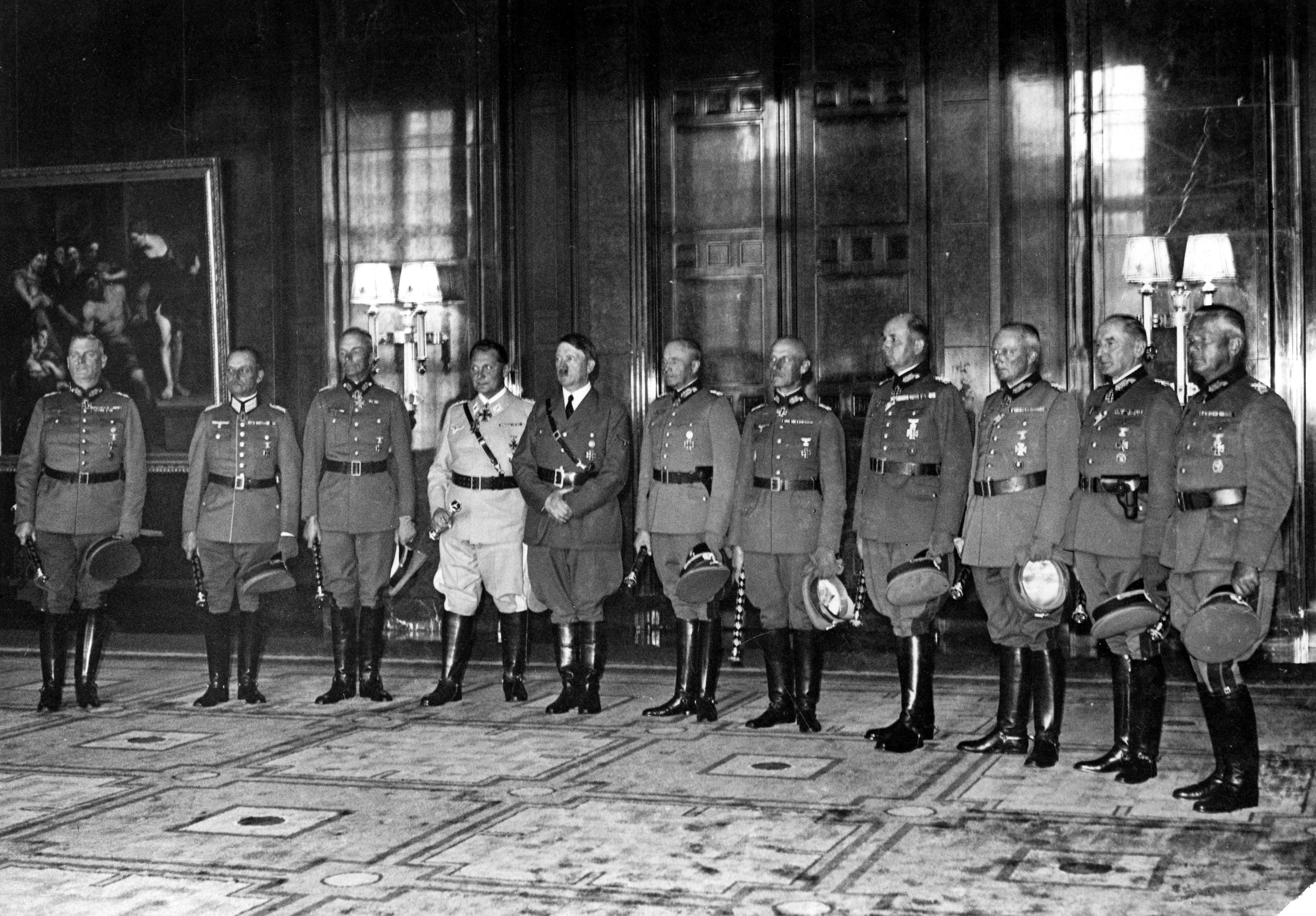
Adolf Hitler posing with his field marshals at the ceremony. Hermann Göring is wearing the white uniform.

The 1940 field marshal ceremony was a promotion ceremony held at the Kroll Opera House in Berlin in which Adolf Hitler promoted twelve generals to the rank of Generalfeldmarschall ("field marshal") on 19 July 1940. It was the first occasion in World War II that Hitler appointed field marshals due to military achievements.

The prestigious rank of field marshal had been banned after World War I. As part of German rearmament, the rank was revived. Hitler promoted twelve selected generals to field marshal during the ceremony in Berlin for their role in the swift victory in the Battle of France and to raise morale. The ceremony highlighted the power and prestige of the Wehrmacht; France was considered to have had the strongest army in Europe, yet had been humiliatingly defeated in just six weeks.

During the same ceremony, Hermann Göring, already Generalfeldmarschall since 1938, was promoted to the rank, newly created especially for him, of Reichsmarschall ('Imperial Marshal').

== Field marshal ==
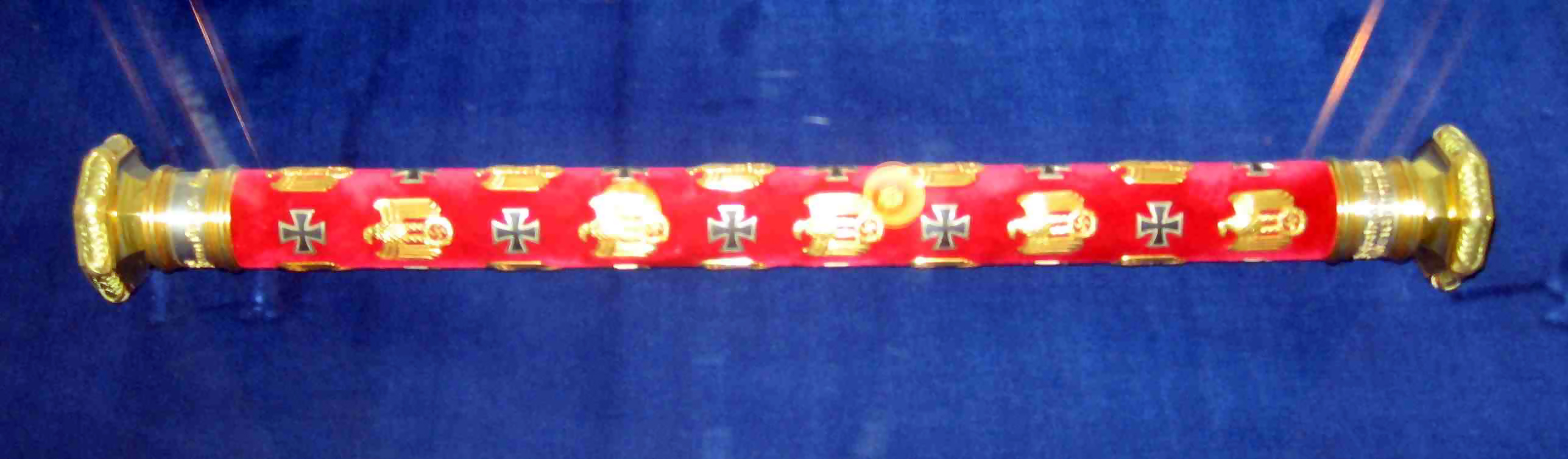
A field marshal's baton of the Wehrmacht

After World War I, the prestigious rank of field marshal was banned in the Weimar Republic, alongside other restrictions of the Treaty of Versailles. After Hitler and the Nazi Party came to national power in January 1933, they began an expansion of the military; it was part of Hitler's desire to restore the army's power and prestige. In 1936, he revived the rank of field marshal. It was the highest and most prestigious military rank in Germany, originally only for the use of War Minister and Commander-in-Chief Werner von Blomberg. The traditional attribute distinguishing a German field marshal was an ornately decorated baton. More tangible benefits included a yearly salary of 36,000 Reichsmarks for life (a Field Marshal was deemed never to retire, but to remain permanently on active duty) and all earnings being exempt from income tax.

== Ceremony ==
Shoulder strap rank insignia of a field marshal in 1940

Flushed with enthusiasm by the swift defeat of the French Army, considered to have been the strongest in Europe, and the Low Countries in June 1940, Hitler wanted to mark the occasion with a grand promotion ceremony. He also hoped the promotions would strengthen his influence over the traditional German General Staff. The twelve generals chosen for promotion, who all had played an important role in the victory, were (with the position they occupied during the Battle of France):

Shoulder strap rank insignia of a reichs marshal in 1940

Portrait	Name (Lifespan)	Position	Ref.
	Colonel General; Walther von Brauchitsch (1881–1948)	Commander-in-Chief of the Army	
	Colonel General; Fedor von Bock (1880–1945)	Commander of Army Group B	
	General of the Aviators; Albert Kesselring (1885–1960)	Commander of Air Fleet 2	
	Colonel General; Wilhelm Keitel (1882–1946)	Commander in Chief of the Oberkommando der Wehrmacht (De facto Minister of War)	
	Colonel General; Günther von Kluge (1882–1944)	Commander of the 4th Army	
	Colonel General; Wilhelm Ritter von Leeb (1876–1956)	Commander of Army Group C	
	Colonel General; Wilhelm List (1880–1971)	Commander of the 12th Army	
	Colonel General; Erhard Milch (1892–1972)	Chief Under-Secretary of State in the Reich Aviation Ministry (De facto Air Force High Command)	
	Field Marshal; Hermann Göring (1893–1946)	Commander-in-Chief of the Air Force	
	Colonel General; Walter von Reichenau (1884–1942)	Commander of the 6th Army	
	Colonel General; Gerd von Rundstedt (1875–1953)	Commander of Army Group A	
	General of the Aviators; Hugo Sperrle (1885–1953)	Commander of Air Fleet 3	
	Colonel General; Erwin von Witzleben (1881–1944)	Commander of the 1st Army	

In particular, all army group commanders were promoted to Field Marshal. In the case of Kesselring and Sperrle, the rank of Colonel General was bypassed. The commanders-in-chief of the navy and air force, Erich Raeder and Göring respectively, were not promoted to Field Marshal because they already held the rank (or its equivalent Grand Admiral respectively). Given that Field Marshal was no longer as exceptional a rank as it was before, Göring, to satisfy his thirst for prestige, was promoted to the specially created rank of Reichsmarschall. This made Göring the senior officer of the military, without, however, making him an actual superior of the army and navy. It also underscored his status as Hitler's designated successor. He was the only person awarded this rank during the Nazi era, and it was abolished after the fall of the Nazi regime.

On 19 July 1940, Hitler summoned the generals to a ceremony in Berlin's Kroll Opera House (which housed the Reichstag after the Reichstag fire). After a speech regarding a peace proposal directed at Britain, Hitler personally rewarded his generals with their expensively decorated batons, and thanked them for their contributions to the victory.

The ceremony was the first occasion Hitler appointed field marshals due to military achievements and was celebrated like no other promotion ceremony in Germany. The remaining five years of the war saw an additional twelve promotions, most of which were without ceremony, such as Friedrich Paulus's promotion, which was conferred over the radio by Hitler. (Note: In deciding to promote Paulus during the Battle of Stalingrad, Hitler noted that there was no known record of a Prussian or German field marshal ever having surrendered. The implication was clear: Paulus was to commit suicide. If Paulus surrendered, Hitler implied he would shame Germany's military history. Paulus, nevertheless, surrendered to Soviet forces on 31 January 1943, the day after he was promoted.)

== Aftermath ==
All of the generals promoted went on to achieve further success in their careers during the early years of victory which the German military obtained in the Second World War. Brauchitsch, Bock, Kesselring, Keitel, Leeb, List, Reichenau, Rundstedt, and Göring would all play decisive and important roles in the German-led Axis invasion of the Soviet Union in 1941. Sperrle spent the rest of the war in semi-retirement, based with his unit in France. Milch was transferred to the production department and was responsible for aircraft production until the end of the war. Following his avid extermination of Jews in the autumn of 1941 (Severity Order, Babi Yar), Reichenau died on 14 January 1942. In 1943, after a series of German defeats on the Eastern Front, and the Allied invasion of Italy, the German military lost all initiative. Hitler's leadership became increasingly disconnected from reality as the war turned against Germany, with the military's defensive strategies often hindered by his slow decision making and frequent directives to hold untenable positions. His response to the worsening war situation was to unceremoniously sack general after general, a routine which ultimately affected the field marshals promoted at the ceremony. Witzleben and Kluge were both involved in the 20 July plot to assassinate Hitler. After it became clear that the assassination attempt had failed, Kluge committed suicide by taking cyanide poison on 17 August 1944. Witzleben was to have become Commander-in-Chief of the Wehrmacht if the attempt had succeeded. He was arrested, stripped of his rank and expelled from the army so that he could be tried in a civilian court, and sentenced to death; the execution was carried out on 8 August 1944. On 4 May 1945, less than a week before Nazi Germany surrendered, Bock died of wounds inflicted the day before by a strafing RNZAF fighter-bomber.

== See also ==
- Bribery of senior Wehrmacht officers
- List of Nazi Party leaders and officials
- List of German field marshals

== Sources ==
- Alford, Kenneth D. (2003). Nazi Plunder: Great Treasure Stories of World War II. Da Capo Press. ISBN 978-0306812415.
- Beevor, Antony (1998). Stalingrad: The Fateful Siege, 1942–43. Viking Press. ISBN 978-0-670-87095-0.
- Biesinger, Joseph A. (2006). Germany: A Reference Guide from the Renaissance to the Present. Facts on File. ISBN 978-0816045211.
- Dear, I.C.B.; Foot, M.R.D., eds. (2005) [1995]. The Oxford Companion to World War II. Oxford University Press. ISBN 978-0-19-280666-6.
- Deighton, Len (2008). Fighter: The True Story of the Battle of Britain. Random House. ISBN 978-1-84595-106-1.
- Ellis, John (1993). World War II Databook: The Essential Facts and Figures for All the Combatants. Aurum. ISBN 1-85410-254-0.
- Evans, Richard J. (2008). The Third Reich at War. Penguin Group. ISBN 978-0-14-311671-4.
- Forczyk, Robert (2010). Manstein: Leadership – Strategy – Conflict. Osprey. ISBN 978-1-84603-221-9.
- Fellgiebel, Walther-Peer (2000). Die Trager Des Ritterkreuzes Des Eisernen Kreuzes, 1939–1945. Podzun-Pallas. ISBN 978-3-7909-0284-6.
- Hakim, Joy (1995). A History of Us: War, Peace and all that Jazz. Oxford University Press. ISBN 0-19-509514-6.
- Knopp, Guido (1998). Hitler's Warriors: Manstein The Strategist. ZDF. Archived from the original on 10 July 2018.
- Grazhdan, Anna (2011). Soviet Storm: World War II in the East. Channel One Russia. Retrieved 7 November 2014.
- Rees, Laurence (2012). The Dark Charisma of Adolf Hitler. BBC.
- Manvell, Roger (2011) [1962]. Goering. Skyhorse. ISBN 978-1-61608-109-6.
- Mackenzie, Simon P. (2014). The Second World War in Europe: Second Edition. Routledge Publishing. ISBN 978-1317864714.
- Melvin, Mungo (2010). Manstein: Hitler's Greatest General. Weidenfeld & Nicolson. ISBN 978-0-297-84561-4.
- Mitcham, Samuel Jr. (2009). Men of Barbarossa – Battles and Leaders of the German Invasion of Russia, 1941. Casemate Books. ISBN 978-193-514-9156.
- Moczarski, Kazimierz (1981). Conversations With an Executioner. Prentice-Hall. ISBN 0-13-171918-1.
- Mitcham, Samuel Jr. (2009a). Defenders of Fortress Europe: The Untold Story of the German Officers During the Allied Invasion. Potomac Books Inc. ISBN 978-1597972741.
- Sandler, Stanley (2002). Ground Warfare: An International Encyclopedia, Bind 1. ABC-Clio. ISBN 978-1576073445.
- Snyder, Louis (1994) [1976]. Encyclopedia of the Third Reich. Da Capo Press. ISBN 978-1-56924-917-8.
- Turney, Alfred W. (1971). Disaster at Moscow: von Bock's Campaigns 1941–42. Cassell & Co. ISBN 0-826-3-01-673.
- Tague, James E. (2011). The Last Field Marshal. Author Solutions. ISBN 978-145-683-185-1.
- Williamson, Gordon (2006). German Commanders of World War II. Osprey Publishing. ISBN 1-84176-597-X.
- Weinberg, Gerhard (1970). The Foreign Policy of Hitler's Germany Diplomatic Revolution in Europe 1933–36. University of Chicago. ISBN 978-0-226-88509-4.
