= Luqman =

Ancient sage in Islamic tradition

Luqman (Arabic: لقمان, romanized: Luqmān; also known as Luqman al-Hakim, meaning Luqman the Wise) was a legendary sage and hero in pre-Islamic Arab tradition. The 31st surah (chapter) of the Qur'an, Luqman, is named after him and depicts him as a monotheist and a father giving pious advice to his son. Subsequently, a large number of proverbs were attributed to Luqman, and at some point in the medieval era he was identified as a writer of fables. Many fables and biographical details which in Europe were connected with Aesop were transferred to Luqman. There are many stories about Luqman in Persian, Arabic and Turkish literature.

== In pre-Islamic Arab tradition ==
In the pre-Islamic era, Arab tradition included the figure of Luqman ibn Ad, who was renowned for his wisdom and long-livedness (hence his epithet al-Mu'ammar 'the Long-lived'). His association with the ancient and disappeared tribe of Ad means that he was placed in the oldest period of Arab history. Many pre-Islamic poets write of his wisdom, and the phrases "as wise as Luqman" or "wiser than Luqman" are standard in panegyrics. Because of his reputation for wisdom, he was thought to be the architect, or one of the architects, of the Ma'rib Dam.

In ancient Arab legend, Luqman was said to have been granted a long life; later Muslim tradition made this a reward for his piety, by which he stood out from his immoral people. In the legend, Luqman is offered several choices and chooses the lifespan of seven vultures (the vulture was the Arabs' most popular symbol of long-livedness). Luqman takes care of his seven vultures one after the other. He finally dies at the same time as the last vulture, named Lubad (meaning 'enduring' or 'remaining'), having lived 560, 1,000, 3,000, or 3,500 years according to different versions of the story. In the Islamic era, only Khidr is held to be longer-lived than Luqman.

Apart from this basic core, it is uncertain what details about Luqman date to the pre-Islamic era and what are later, Islamic-era accretions. In one tradition which may derive from pre-Islamic Meccan folklore, Luqman is one of the ambassadors sent by the Adites to pray for rain at the Kaaba. Even in its pre-Islamic form, the legend of Luqman displays certain parallels with stories from other cultures. René Basset links the story of Luqman and the vultures to Sidonius Apollinaris's explanation of Romulus's watching for twelve birds, which turn out to be twelve vultures, meaning that Rome will last for twelve centuries.

== In the Qur'an ==
The 31st surah (chapter) of the Qur'an is named after Luqman. There is no mention in the surah of his long-livedness or his Adite origin; nor is Luqman brought up elsewhere in the Qur'an in connection with the Ad and its prophet Hud, which are mentioned at various points. He is only mentioned in the surah named after him. In verse 12 of the surah (31:12), it is said that God gave Luqman wisdom (hikmah); according to one interpretation, hikmah should be understood here to mean a book of maxims. In verses 13 and 16–19, Luqman appears as a father giving pious advice to his son. According to B. Heller and N. A. Stillmann's article in the Encyclopaedia of Islam (2nd edition), Luqman's counsels "bear the unmistakable stamp of ancient Near Eastern wisdom literature." Three times, Luqman begins his advice with the formula "O my dear son" (yabunayya), which is found in many of the aphorisms attributed to Ahikar; the admonition in verse 18 (31:18) has been compared to one of Ahikar's maxims. Verses 20–34 are partially in the same genre but no longer cite Luqman. Verse 27 (31:27) is thought to derive from Jewish wisdom literature but is considered later than the rest of the surah.

== In Islamic tradition ==
As Heller and Stillmann state, "Once the Ḳurʾān had consecrated Luḳmān as the wise utterer of proverbs, everything that was thought pious or sensible could be attributed to him." Arabic collections of proverbs attribute many sayings to Luqman. In the Qisas al-Anbiya (Lives of the prophets) of Abu Ishaq al-Tha'labi, a chapter is dedicated to Luqman's wisdom. Many sayings attributed to Luqman resemble those of Ahikar. It is possible that many proverbs deriving from the general body of Middle Eastern wisdom literature had already reached the Arabian Peninsula in the pre-Islamic period and began to be attributed to Luqman.

Unlike other sages of the past, Luqman was not classed as a prophet by traditional Muslim scholars (the only exception being Ikrima al-Barbari), since the Qur'an only says that he received wisdom from God. Despite this, he is mentioned in most works of the Qisas al-Anbiya genre. According to most versions, God gave Luqman the choice between becoming a prophet or a sage, and he chose the latter. He becomes a vizier to King David, who says to him, "Blessed art thou, O Luḳmān. You have been given wisdom and spared tribulation, while David has been given authority and has suffered trials and rebellion". Most of the Islamic-era accounts give Luqman a biblical genealogy, variously linking him with Abraham, Job and Balaam. He is supposed to have lived until the time of the prophet Jonah. He is also identified as a judge of the Jews. Some versions credit him with writing a book.

At some point in the medieval era, Luqman was identified as a writer of fables. This may be because the Arabic word for proverbs, amthal, is also the word for fables. Many fables and biographical details which in Europe were connected with Aesop were transferred to Luqman. The connection between Luqman and Aesop dates to an early period: the Qur'anic commentators record traditions that Luqman was a "thick-lipped, flat-footed black slave" of Ethiopian or Nubian origin. Other accounts describe his as an Egyptian, a carpenter, a shepherd, and having deformed legs. According to Heller and Stillmann, these descriptions and a number of anecdotes about Luqman "are obviously modelled on the story of Aesop." However, the older Arabic literature did not know Luqman as a fabulist; this identification only came in the later medieval period. A manuscript dated 1299 contains 41 fables attributed to Luqman; it was first published by J. Derenbourg in the 19th century and extensively examined. Almost all of the 41 fables are found in the Syriac version of Aesop's fables published by J. Landsberger in 1859 (Die Fabeln des Sophos). Thus, these "Fables of Luqman" are regarded as a translation and adaptation of the Syriac version of Aesop, deriving from Christian circles in Mamluk Syria.

== Identity ==
Luqman is described by Heller and Stillmann as a "composite, and hence a many-sided figure" who "has often been compared and identified with other legendary heroes, such as Prometheus, Alkmaion, Lucian and Solomon." According to one view, there were originally two distinct figures who were conflated: Luqman ibn Ad and Luqman al-Hakim (the Luqman of the Qur'an); later, attributes of a variety of figures were connected with the name of Luqman. His identification with Balaam of the Bible is old. It was apparently made by some Muslim exegetes searching for an equivalent to Luqman in the Bible (the Semitic roots b-l-ʿ and l-q-m both mean 'to swallow'). However, Luqman and Balaam were clearly distinguished by Muhammad and his contemporaries, as well as by al-Tabari writing in the 9th–10th centuries AD. One modern scholar hypothesizes that early Muslim traditionalists' Jewish sources identified Luqman with the Edomite king Bela son of Beor; as Balaam is also called a son of Beor in the Bible, this may have caused the conflation of Luqman and Balaam.

The similarity between Luqman and Ahikar has long been noted. In the early 20th century, Rendel Harris argued for the identification of the two figures. However, Heller and Stillmann reject this identification. Many of the sayings attributed to Ahikar and Luqman came from the "common stock of Near Eastern lore" and also appear in the Bible and other sources. In their view, Luqman and Ahikar are only indirectly connected through the story of Aesop, which itself is closely related to that of Ahikar.

== In Turkish and Persian literature and folklore ==
Luqman was "a fairly popular figure in Persian literature." He is a subject of a long chapter in al-Nisaburi's Qisas al-Anbiya, which adds some new material to the anecdotes found in the Arabic qisas. The Masnavi of Rumi contains several stories about Luqman, depicting him as an idealized ascetic and a slave who is free of sensual desires. He is similarly depicted in a story in the Bustan of Saadi Shirazi. From Arabic and Persian literature, Luqman entered the Turkish tradition, where he is also depicted as an Arab doctor (an extension of his title hakim, which besides 'wise' also means 'physician').
