= Luqman (sūrah) =

31st chapter of the Qur'an

Surah 31 of the Quran
لقمان Luqmān Luqman
- Qira'ah; English text
- Classification: Meccan
- Position: Juzʼ 21
- Hizb no.: 42
- No. of verses: 34
- No. of Rukus: 4
- No. of words: 550
- No. of letters: 2171

Luqman (Arabic: لقمان, romanized: Luqmān) is the 31st sūrah of the Qur'an. It is composed of 34 verses (āyāt) and takes its title from the mention of the sage Luqman and his advice to his son in verses 12–19. According to asbāb al-nuzūl or Islamic traditional chronology, it was revealed in the middle of the Meccan period and is thus usually classified as a Meccan sura.

== Summary ==
The focus of this sura, once broken down into its many elements, can be seen as emphasizing principles of moderation. The sura uses the mustard seed analogy to emphasize the degree to which God maintains his purview over man's actions, possibly emphasizing the fact that any evil or good deed no matter how small is recorded and will be brought out by Allah in the Day of Judgement. A final point of focus for Sura 31 comes down to the purpose of God's creation. 31:29 and 31:20 show how God's intention through creation was to better mankind, and his signs are theoretically everywhere, from rain to vegetation. This emphasis once again reminds people of their subservience to Allah while also driving home the idea that man is meant to do good on Earth. Man's purpose is to serve God, while the Earth has been created in order to facilitate man's needs.

== Āyāt ==
- 1–2 The Quran a direction and mercy to the righteous
- 3–4 The righteous described
- 5–6 An unbeliever rebuked for his contempt for the Quran
- 7–8 Blessed rewards of the righteous
- 9–11 God the Creator of heaven and earth
- 12 Luqman gifted with wisdom
- 13–19 Luqman gives his son advice
- 20 The unreasonableness of infidel contention
- 21 The security of true believers
- 22–23 The certain punishment of unbelief
- 24–26 Praise to God, the self-sufficient Creator
- 27 God’s words infinite in number
- 28 Man’s creation an evidence of God’s sovereignty
- 29–31 The heavens declare the glory of God
- 32 The ingratitude of idolaters to God
- 33–34 Men warned to prepare for judgment

== Reading Qur'an 31 ==
Surah Luqman in Arabic

Like many Quranic narratives, Sura 31 features many intertextual references. Carl Ernst identified what he calls "ring structure" Sura 31 can be reinterpreted based on its inherent conceptual breaks. He proposed breakdown of Surah 31 and its "ring structure":

- A1–11 Omniscience and self-sufficiency of God for the betterment of mankind pt.1
  - 2–5 The Righteous are mentioned and their good habits are encouraged
  - 6–7 The disbelievers are highlighted, contrasting the early practices of pious practicers
  - 8–11 Paradise is revealed as reward, God's omnipotence is prominently highlighted as being predominantly for the betterment of man
- B12–15 Rules and guidelines
  - 12–13 Luqman bequeaths knowledge to his son, No partners may be ascribed to God, and He is the highest power
  - 14 Obey and be good to parents, a powerful reference to the struggle of motherhood
  - 15 It explain that God believers should not obey their parents when they try to make them to believe in other partners with God but accompany your parents in life with kindness.
- X16–17 The chiastic middle
  - 16 Omnipotence of God is compared to ability to see everything [i.e. the size of a mustard seed]
  - 17 It is revealed through prayer, forbidding wrong, and employing moderation, are the values a believer should aspire too.

B': Rules and guidelines pt. 2 18–19 Employ manners and moderation in society to better follow God
A': 20–34 Omniscience and self-sufficiency of God for the betterment of mankind pt. 2

- 20–21 Disbelievers are called out once again and reminded of their punishment
- 22 Believers counter the disbelievers
- 23 The Prophet should not be sad that disbelievers are astray
- 24–34 The Omnipotence and infinite scope of God's power is reiterated
- 29–32 All of God's acts are for the betterment of mankind
- 31–34 Judgement day is a bookend, emphasizing the need for right practice and submission to God
