= Reichsmarschall =

Military rank

- Standard from 1941 to 1945 (left side)

- Collar insignia

- Shoulder boards
- Country: Nazi Germany
- Service branch: Wehrmacht
- Formation: 12th century (historical); 19 July 1940
- Abolished: 1945
- Next lower rank: Generalfeldmarschall; Großadmiral

Reichsmarschall (German: Reichsmarschall des Großdeutschen Reiches; lit. 'Reich Marshal of the Greater German Reich') was an honorary military rank, specially created for Hermann Göring during World War II, and the de jure highest rank in the Wehrmacht. It was senior to the rank of Generalfeldmarschall (lit. 'general field marshal', equivalent to field marshal, which was previously the highest rank in the Wehrmacht), but was merely a ceremonial appointment to accentuate Göring's position as Hitler's designated successor. No actual subordination of the other field marshals or a superior position of the holder followed from it. It was equivalent to General of the Armies in the United States, or Generalissimo in other countries.

== History ==
Until July 1940, the highest rank in the German military was Generalfeldmarschall. At the beginning of World War II, the only active holder of that rank was Hermann Göring, Commander-in-Chief of the Luftwaffe. On 19 July 1940, following the German victory in the Battle of France, Adolf Hitler held a ceremony in which he promoted twelve generals to the rank of Generalfeldmarschall. During the same ceremony, Göring was elevated to the newly created rank of Reichsmarschall, a symbolic move to highlight his seniority over other Wehrmacht commanders and to fulfill his ambitions for prestige, though it conferred no additional authority. (Note: Göring also held many other prestigious titles, such as Reichsjägermeister (lit. 'Reich Master of the Hunt') and Commissioner Plenipotentiary of the Four Year Plan.) This was done in order to ensure that the Oberkommando der Wehrmacht ('High Command of the Armed Forces', abbreviated in German to OKW), which was headed by Hitler, would retain overall control and authority over the German military.

Earlier, on the day Germany invaded Poland, Hitler designated Göring as his successor, a status underscored by a 1941 decree that empowered Göring to act as Hitler's deputy with full freedom of action in the event Hitler was incapacitated. Nevertheless, on 23 April 1945, when Göring suggested to Hitler that he assume leadership of the crumbling remains of Nazi Germany, Hitler relieved Göring of his duties and named a new successor in his last will and testament, Grand Admiral Karl Dönitz. Dönitz's appointment was made on or before the day of Hitler's suicide.

== Standards ==
Standard from 1940 to 1941 (left side)

Standard from 1940 to 1941 (right side)

Standard from 1941 to 1945 (left side)

Standard from 1941 to 1945 (right side)

== Uniform ==
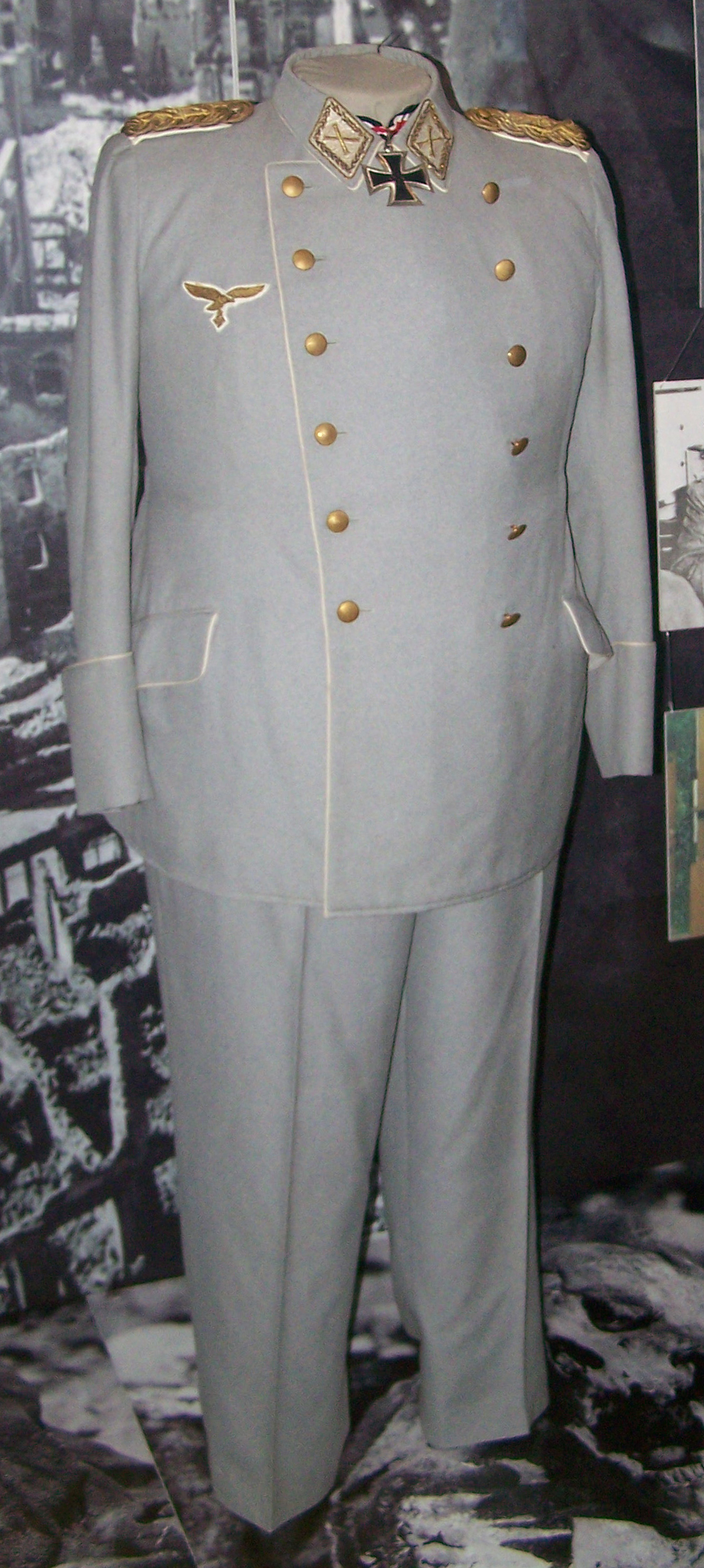
Göring's uniform shown in the Luftwaffenmuseum der Bundeswehr in Berlin

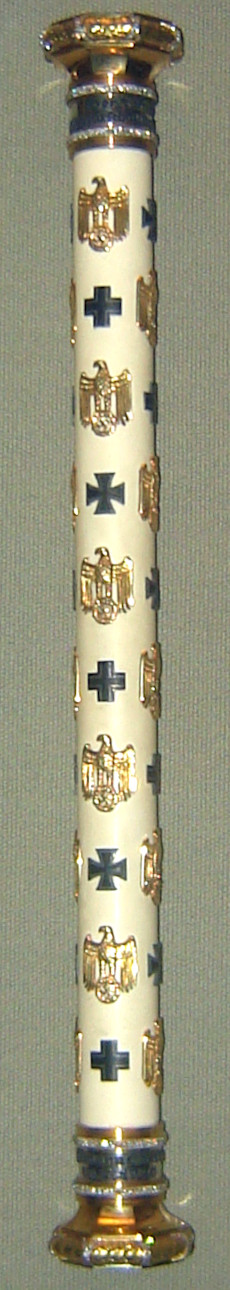
The original baton shown in the West Point Museum

== Sources ==
- Haskew, Michael (2011a). The Wehrmacht. Amber Books. ISBN 978-1-907446-95-5.
- Haskew, Michael (2011b). The Wehrmacht. Amber Books. ISBN 978-1-907446-99-3.
- O'Donnell, James P. (1979). The History of the Reich Chancellery Group. London, UK: J. M. Dent. OCLC 638799214.

Junior rank Generalfeldmarschall (Army and Luftwaffe); Großadmiral (Kriegsmarine)	(Ranks Wehrmacht); Reichsmarschall	Senior rank None
