= List of Iranian field marshals =

Iranian field marshals

The following individuals held the rank of field marshal in Iran (Persia):

- Prince Husain Quli Khan-e Qajar Quyunlu (1742–1831)
- Prince Ja'afar Qoli Khan-e Qajar Qovanlu (1752–1791)
- Amir Muhammad Qasim Khan-e Qajar Quyunlu (d. 1831)
- Crown Prince Abbas Mirza (1789–1833)
- Prince Hasan Ali Mirza (1789–1853)
- Prince Ali Shah Mirza (1796–1854)
- Fath-Ali Shah Qajar (1797–1834)
- Prince Kaikhusru Mirza (1809–1857)
- Prince Bahman Mirza Qajar (1811–1884)
- Prince Sultan Masud Mirza (1850–1918)
- 1899 - Prince Vajihullah Mirza (1854–1905)
- Prince Kamran Mirza (1856–1927)
- Prince Abul Husain Mirza (1858–1939)
- 1921 - Rezā Khan (later Rezā Shāh Pahlavī) (1878–1944)
- Mohammad Rezā Shāh Pahlavī (1919–1980)
- Amir Mirza Muhammad Khan-e Qajar Devehlu
- Mirza Muhammad Taqi Khan-e Farahani
- Agha Vali Khan
- Mirza Hosein Khan Qazvini
- Mirza Muhammad Bakir Khan
