= List of field marshals of the Ottoman Empire =

The following officers held the rank of Field Marshal in the Ottoman army.

- 25 June 1832 – Muhammad Ali Pasha (1769–1849)
- 12 November 1849 – Abbas I Hilmi Pasha (1812–1854)
- 25 August 1854 – Muhammed Said Pasha (1822–1876)
- 1864 – Omer Pasha – (1806–1871)
- 19 July 1868 – Muhammed Tawfik Pasha (1852–1892)
- 10 July 1871 – Ahmed Muhtar Pasha (Ghazi Ahmed Mukhtar Pasha)
- 1875 – Prince Hasan Ismail Pasha
- 1875 – Yusuf Izzettin Efendi (1857–1916)
- 1875 – Hussein Kamel Pasha (1853–1917)
- 1879 – Muhammed Ratib Pasha (d.1920)
- 23 February 1889 – Prince Ibrahim Hilmi Pasha
- 14 January 1914 – Otto Liman von Sanders
- 19 August 1914 – Guido von Usedom
- 1916 – Sayyid Ahmed as-Sanussi
- 9 July 1917 – Erich von Falkenhayn
- 14 July 1918 – Ahmed Izzet Pasha (1864–1937)
- Muhammed Pasha Jahangiri (1710–1788)
- Ibrahim Pasha of Egypt (1789–1848)
- Muhammed Said Pasha (1798–1868)
- Mehmed Namık Pasha (1804–1892)
- Ibrahim Pasha (1828–1880)
- Charles Gordon (Gordon Pasha) (1833–1885)
- Mahmud Adam Pasha (1836–1886)
- Mahmud Jalal ud-din Pasha (1836–1884)
- Yahya Mansur Yeghen Pasha (1837–1913)
- Ghazi Osman Nuri Pasha (1837–1900)
- Muhammed Nuri Pasha (1840–1890)
- Ibrahim Fahmi Ahmed Pasha (1847–1893)
- Prince Hasan Ismail Pasha (1854–1888)
- Muhammed Pasha (1856–1889)
- Zulkiful Ahmed Pasha (1860–1941)
- Ali Khalid Pasha (1860–1948)
- Ali Nur ud-din Pasha (1867–1952)
- Muhammed Kamal ud-din Pasha (1869–1920)
- Colmar Freiherr von der Goltz Pasha
- Morali Ibrahim Pasha
- Deli Fuad Pasha
- Mehmed Rauf Pasha
- Prince Muhammed Tusun Pasha
- Ahmed Ayub Pasha
- Arif Pasha
- Ahmed Fathi Pasha
- Ethem Pasha
- Velip Pasha
- Kasim Pasha Jalimoglu
- Prince Ibrahim Hilmi Ismail Pasha
- Müşir Zeki Pasha (1830–1924)
