= Generalfeldmarschall =

Historical military rank of Germany and Austria

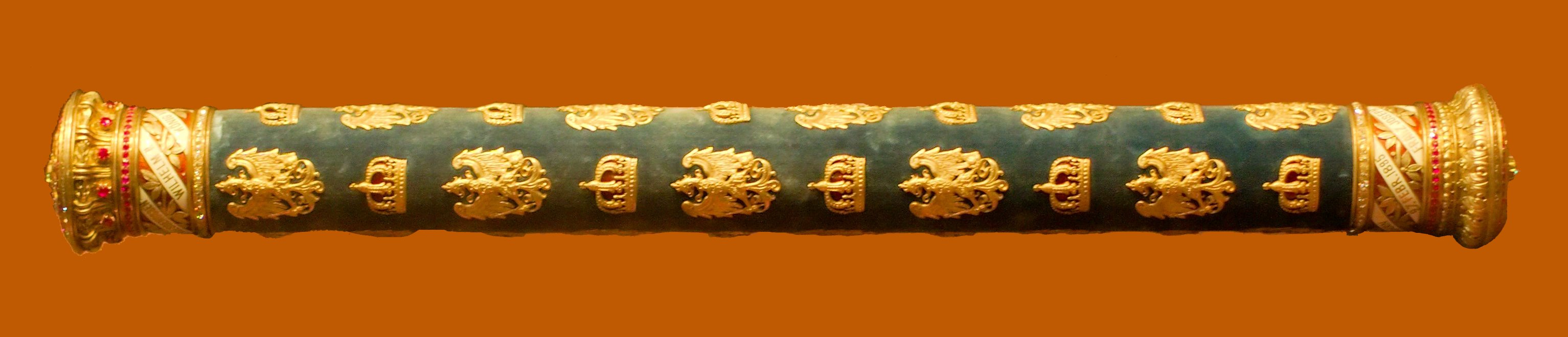
Prussian marshal's baton, awarded to Emperor Franz Joseph I of Austria in 1895

Generalfeldmarschall (German: [ɡenəʁaːlˈfɛltmaʁʃal]; from Old High German marahscalc, "marshal, stable master, groom"; English: general field marshal, field marshal general, or field marshal; often abbreviated to Feldmarschall) was a rank in the armies of several German states and the Holy Roman Empire, (Reichsgeneralfeldmarschall); in the Habsburg monarchy, the Austrian Empire and Austria-Hungary, the rank Feldmarschall was used. The rank was the equivalent to Großadmiral (English: Grand Admiral) in the Kaiserliche Marine and Kriegsmarine, a five-star rank, comparable to OF-10 in today's NATO naval forces.

== Austrian Empire and Austria-Hungary ==
Feldmarschall of the k.u.k. Army (Paroli)

The rank existed in the Austrian Empire as Kaiserlicher Feldmarschall ("imperial field marshal") and in Austria-Hungary as Kaiserlicher und königlicher Feldmarschall - Császári és királyi tábornagy ("imperial and royal field marshal"). Both were based on prior usage during the Holy Roman Empire. The Emperor-King held the rank ex officio, other officers were promoted as required. Between 1914 and 1918, ten men attained this rank, of whom four were members of the reigning Habsburg-Lorraine dynasty.

== Germany and Prussia ==
=== German armies and air forces until 1945 ===
Historical ranks (ascending):

- Generalmajor
- Generalleutnant
- General der Waffengattung
- Generaloberst
- Generalfeldmarschall

=== Kingdom of Prussia and German Empire ===
Rank insignia / uniform

Collar patch 1832

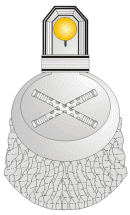
Epaulette

Shoulder board

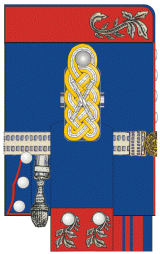
Service uniform

Generalfeldmarschall until 1918

In the Royal Prussian Army, the subsequent Imperial German Army and later in the Wehrmacht of Nazi Germany, the rank of Generalfeldmarschall had several privileges, such as elevation to nobility, equal protocol rank with Cabinet ministers, the right of reporting directly to the monarch, and a constant escort.

In 1854, the rank of Generaloberst (colonel general) was created in order to promote Wilhelm, Crown Prince of Prussia (the later Wilhelm I, German Emperor) to senior rank without breaking the rule that only wartime field commanders could receive the rank of field marshal for a victory in a decisive battle or the capture of a fortification or major town. The equivalent of Generaloberst in the German Navy was Generaladmiral (general admiral or admiral-general).

In 1870, Prince Friedrich Karl of Prussia and Crown Prince Friedrich Wilhelm—who had commanded armies during the Franco-Prussian War—became the first Prussian princes appointed to the rank of Generalfeldmarschall.

The exalted nature of the rank was underscored during World War I, when only five German officers (excluding honorary promotions to members of royal families and foreign officers) were designated Generalfeldmarschall: Paul von Hindenburg, August von Mackensen, Karl von Bülow, Hermann von Eichhorn, and Remus von Woyrsch. Only a single naval officer, Henning von Holtzendorff, was designated Grand Admiral. Not even such well-known German commanders as Erich Ludendorff, Erich von Falkenhayn, or Reinhard Scheer received marshal's batons or Grand Admiral rank.

General field marshal Generalfeldmarschall
- Rank flag

- Gorget patches and shoulder board (1942–1945); Top: Army; Bottom: Luftwaffe

- Sleeve insignia for camouflage uniform without shoulder board
- Country: Nazi Germany
- Formation: 20 April 1936
- Abolished: 8 May 1945
- Next higher rank: Reichsmarschall
- Next lower rank: Generaloberst
- Equivalent ranks: Großadmiral

Before the Second World War, Adolf Hitler reintroduced the rank into the Wehrmacht with the promotion of the Reich Minister of War, Generaloberst Werner von Blomberg (20 April 1936), and the Aviation Minister, Hermann Göring (4 February 1938), to the rank of Generalfeldmarschall. In the Wehrmacht of Nazi Germany during the Second World War, the rank of Generalfeldmarschall remained the highest military rank until July 1940, when Hermann Göring was promoted to the newly created higher rank of Reichsmarschall. The equivalent of a Generalfeldmarschall in the navy was Großadmiral (grand admiral).

Unlike Kaiser Wilhelm II, Hitler distributed the rank more widely, promoting 25 Heer and Luftwaffe officers in total and two Kriegsmarine Grand Admirals. (Another promotion, that of Austrian General Eduard von Böhm-Ermolli, was honorary.) Four weeks after the Heer and Luftwaffe had won the Battle of France, Hitler promoted nine Army generals and three of the air force to the rank of field marshal on 19 July 1940: Walther von Brauchitsch, Wilhelm Keitel, Gerd von Rundstedt, Fedor von Bock, Wilhelm von Leeb, Wilhelm List, Günther von Kluge, Erwin von Witzleben and Walter von Reichenau (of the Heer); and Albert Kesselring, Erhard Milch and Hugo Sperrle (of the Luftwaffe). The holders of this rank had the right to a "direct presentation to the Führer".

In 1942, three other men were promoted—Wüstenfuchs ('Desert Fox') Erwin Rommel (22 June) for the siege of Tobruk, Erich von Manstein (30 June) for the Siege of Sevastopol, and Georg von Küchler (30 June) for his success as Oberbefehlshaber der Heeresgruppe Nord (commander-in-chief of Army Group North).

Hitler promoted Friedrich Paulus, commander of the 6th Army at the Battle of Stalingrad, to the rank of Generalfeldmarschall via field radio on 30 January 1943, a day before his army's inevitable surrender, in order to encourage him to continue to fight until death or commit suicide. In the promotion, Hitler noted that no German or, before that, Prussian field marshal had ever been captured alive. Generalfeldmarschall Paulus surrendered the following day anyway, claiming, Ich habe nicht die Absicht, mich für diesen bayerischen Gefreiten zu erschießen. ("I have no intention of shooting myself for this Bavarian corporal.") A disappointed Hitler commented, "That's the last field marshal I make in this war!" Nevertheless, he appointed seven more, three on the very day following Paulus' surrender: Ernst Busch, Paul Ludwig Ewald von Kleist and Maximilian von Weichs (all members of the Heer). Later that same month, Hitler promoted Luftwaffe General Wolfram von Richthofen to the rank for his service in the Crimean campaign, and the later part of the Battle of Stalingrad.

From 1944 to 1945, three more men would reach this rank. In early 1944, Walter Model, one of Hitler's most loyal generals, was promoted to the rank; he was also the last German field marshal to receive a ceremonial marshal's baton. Ferdinand Schörner, another loyal officer, was promoted on 5 April 1945. Three weeks later, he was made Commander-in-Chief of the German Army in Hitler's last will and testament. On 25 April, just five days before his own suicide, Adolf Hitler made Luftwaffe General Robert Ritter von Greim a field marshal and commander in chief of the German Air Force after Göring had fallen out of Hitler's favour, making Greim the last German field marshal in history.

Financially, the rank of Generalfeldmarschall in Nazi Germany was very rewarding as, apart from a yearly salary, Hitler introduced tax free fringe benefits for generals in the range of 2,000 to 4,000 ℛ︁ℳ︁ (€8,897–17,793 in 2021) per month in 1940. He also bestowed generous presents on his highest officers, with Leeb receiving 250,000 ℛ︁ℳ︁ (€1,112,067 in 2021) for his 65th birthday from Hitler.

Promotion to the rank did not guarantee Hitler's ongoing favour, however. As the tide of the war turned, Hitler took out his frustrations on his top commanders, relieving most of the Generalfeldmarschalls of duty before the war's conclusion. Bock, Brauchitsch, Leeb, and List were all relieved of their posts in 1942 for perceived failures during Operation Barbarossa and took no further active part in the war. Kleist, Manstein and Sperrle were similarly retired in 1944 and Rundstedt and Weichs in March 1945. Grand Admiral Erich Raeder was retired in January 1943 following a fierce argument with Hitler over the future of the German surface fleet. Model, one of Hitler's most successful commanders, had nevertheless lost the Fuhrer's confidence by war's end and committed suicide to avoid capture and likely trial as a war criminal. Milch was relieved after conspiring unsuccessfully to have Göring removed from command of the Luftwaffe, and even Göring himself was stripped of his offices and expelled from the Nazi Party in Hitler's last days. Schörner ignominiously abandoned his command to save himself in the war's last days. Kluge, Witzleben and Rommel were either executed or forced to commit suicide for their real or imagined roles in the 20 July plot against Hitler. By war's end, only Keitel, Kesselring, Greim and Grand Admiral Karl Dönitz were still in positions of military responsibility.

=== East Germany ===
The National People's Army of the Deutsche Demokratische Republik (DDR) (German Democratic Republic, i.e. East Germany) created the rank of Marshal of the German Democratic Republic on 25 March 1982. A general could be appointed to this rank by the State Council (Staatsrat; the head-of-state council of the GDR) during wartime or for exceptional military achievement; no one ever held the rank, however.

=== Modern Germany ===
The ranks of Generalfeldmarschall, Generaloberst, Großadmiral and Generaladmiral no longer exist in the new German (until 1990 West German) Armed Forces, the Bundeswehr, which were created in 1956. Currently, the highest military grades in the Bundeswehr are general and admiral.

The Commander-in-Chief of the Bundeswehr is, in peacetime, according to Article 65a of the Basic Law for the Federal Republic of Germany (constitution), the civilian Federal Minister of Defence, who holds supreme command authority over all soldiers. In wartime, during the State of Defence, that supreme command authority is transferred to the Federal Chancellor. The Inspector General of the Bundeswehr is the military chief of defence and heads the Armed Forces Command Staff (German: Führungsstab der Streitkräfte).

== Other states to have used the title ==
=== Electorate (1356–1806) and Kingdom of Saxony (1806–1918) ===
The rank of Field Marshal was first used in the northern German State of Saxony within the Holy Roman Empire in 1631. It was then used nine further times in that century and seven times in the 18th century. It was used twice in the 19th century by the Kingdom of Saxony after it became part of the German Empire in 1871.

=== Ethiopia ===
The rank of Field Marshal General was first used in Ethiopia in 2022. On 8 January 2022, Prime Minister Abiy Ahmed presided over the Ethiopian National Defense Force promotion ceremony, that saw the rank be introduced to Birhanu Jula, Chief of General Staff.

=== Russia ===
The Rank of General-Field marshal (Russian: Генерал-фельдмаршал) was used in the Russian Empire until 1917 when the Russian Soviet Federative Socialist Republic, as part of the rank system being abolished as a whole, abolished it. In 1935, it was reintroduced as the Marshal of the Soviet Union (Russian: Маршал Советского Союза) under Joseph Stalin, which lasted until the dissolution of the Soviet Union. In 1993, with the declaration of the Russian Federation, it was reintroduced once more as the Marshal of the Russian Federation (Russian: Маршал Российской Федерации).

== See also ==
- Comparative officer ranks of World War I
- Comparative officer ranks of World War II
