= Field marshal (Russia) =

Highest Imperial Russian military rank

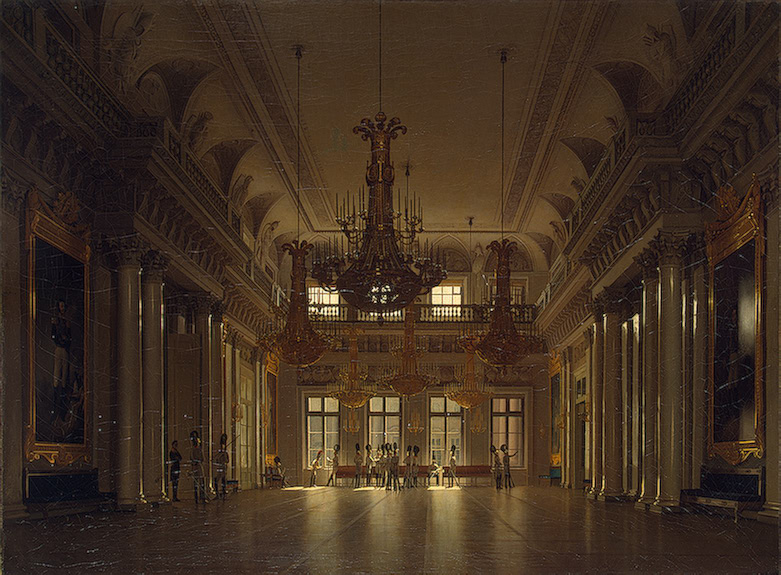
The Field Marshals' Hall of the Winter Palace. Russian cuirassiers can be seen observing the paintings.

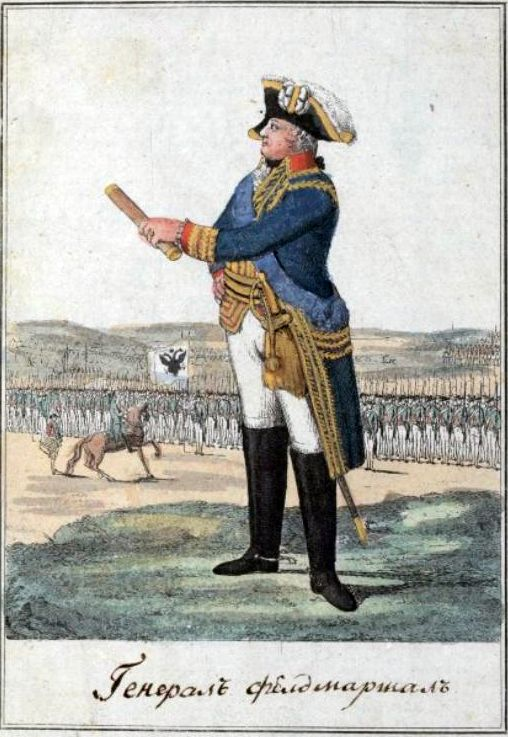
Uniform of a Russian General-feldmarshal (1793)

General-feldmarshal (Russian: Генерал-фельдмаршал, from German: general-feldmarschall) was, with the exception of generalissimo, the highest military rank of the Russian Empire. It was a military rank of the 1st class in the Imperial Russian Army and equal to those of Chancellor and Active Privy Councillor, 1st class in civil service, and General Admiral in the Imperial Russian Navy. After the Russian Revolution of 1917 the rank was abolished, alongside the Table of Ranks. In 1935 however, the Red Army introduced the equivalent rank of "Marshal of the Soviet Union" (Russian: Маршал Советского Союза) as the highest military rank of the Soviet Union, when ranks were restored under Stalin's rule.

== List ==
The rank of field marshal was bestowed on the following 64 Imperial Russian Army officers:

Appointed	Portrait	Name	Lifespan
1700		Count Fyodor Golovin	1650–1706
1701		Count Boris Sheremetev	1652–1719
1709		Prince Alexander Danilovich Menshikov	1673–1729
1725		Prince Anikita Repnin	1668–1726
1725		Prince Mikhail Mikhailovich Golitsyn	1675–1730
1726		Count Jacob Bruce	1670–1735
1726		Jan Kazimierz Sapieha	Before 1679–1730
1728		Prince Ivan Trubetskoy	1667–1750
1728		Prince Vasily Vladimirovich Dolgorukov	1667–1746
1732		Count Burkhard Christoph von Münnich	1683–1767
1736		Count Peter von Lacy	1678–1751
1742		Prince Ludwig Gruno von Hesse-Homburg	1705–1745
1756		Stepan Apraksin	1702–1758
1756		Prince Nikita Trubetskoy	1699–1767
1756		Count Alexander Buturlin	1694–1767
1756		Count Alexei Razumovsky	1709–1771
1759		Count Pyotr Saltykov	1698–1772
1761		Count Alexander Ivanovich Shuvalov	1710–1771
1761		Count Pyotr Ivanovich Shuvalov	1711–1762
1761		Peter August Friedrich, Duke of Schleswig-Holstein-Sonderburg-Beck	1697–1775
1762		Prince Georg Ludwig of Holstein-Gottorp	1719–1763
1762		Count Alexey Bestuzhev-Ryumin	1693–1766
1762		Prince Nikita Trubetskoy	1699–1769
1764		Count Kirill Razumovsky	1728–1803
1769		Prince Alexander Mikhailovich Golitsyn	1718–1783
1770		Count Pyotr Rumyantsev	1725–1796
1773		Count Zakhar Chernyshev	1722–1784
1784		Prince Grigory Potemkin	1739–1791
1794		Prince Aleksandr Suvorov	1729–1800
1796		Count Ivan Saltykov	1730–1805
1796		Prince Nikolai Vasilyevich Repnin	1734–1801
1796		Prince Nikolai Saltykov	1736–1816
1796		Count Ivan Chernyshyov	1726–1797
1797		Count Johann Martin von Elmpt	1725–1802
1797		Count Valentin Musin-Pushkin	1735–1804
1797		Count Mikhail Kamensky	1738–1809
1797		Victor François de Broglie, 2nd Duke of Broglie	1718–1804
1807		Prince Alexander Prozorovsky	1732–1809
1807		Count Ivan Gudovich	1741–1820
1812		Prince Mikhail Golenischev-Kutuzov	1745–1813
1814		Prince Mikhail Barclay de Tolly	1761–1818
1825		Prince Fabian Gottlieb von der Osten-Sacken	1752–1837
1826		Ludwig Adolph Peter, Prince of Sayn-Wittgenstein-Berleburg-Ludwigsburg	1769–1843
1829		Prince Ivan Paskevich	1782–1856
1829		Count Hans Karl von Diebitsch-Zabalkansky	1785–1831
1850		Prince Pyotr Volkonsky	1776–1852
1856		Prince Mikhail Vorontsov	1782–1856
1859		Prince Aleksandr Baryatinsky	1815–1879
1866		Count Friedrich Wilhelm Rembert von Berg	1793–1874
1878		Grand Duke Nikolai Nikolaevich	1831–1891
1878		Grand Duke Mikhail Nikolaevich	1832–1909
1894		Count Iosif Vladimirovich Gurko	1828–1901
1898		Count Dmitry Milyutin	1816–1912

== Honorific rank to foreigners ==
The honorific rank of field marshal was also bestowed on several foreign citizens:

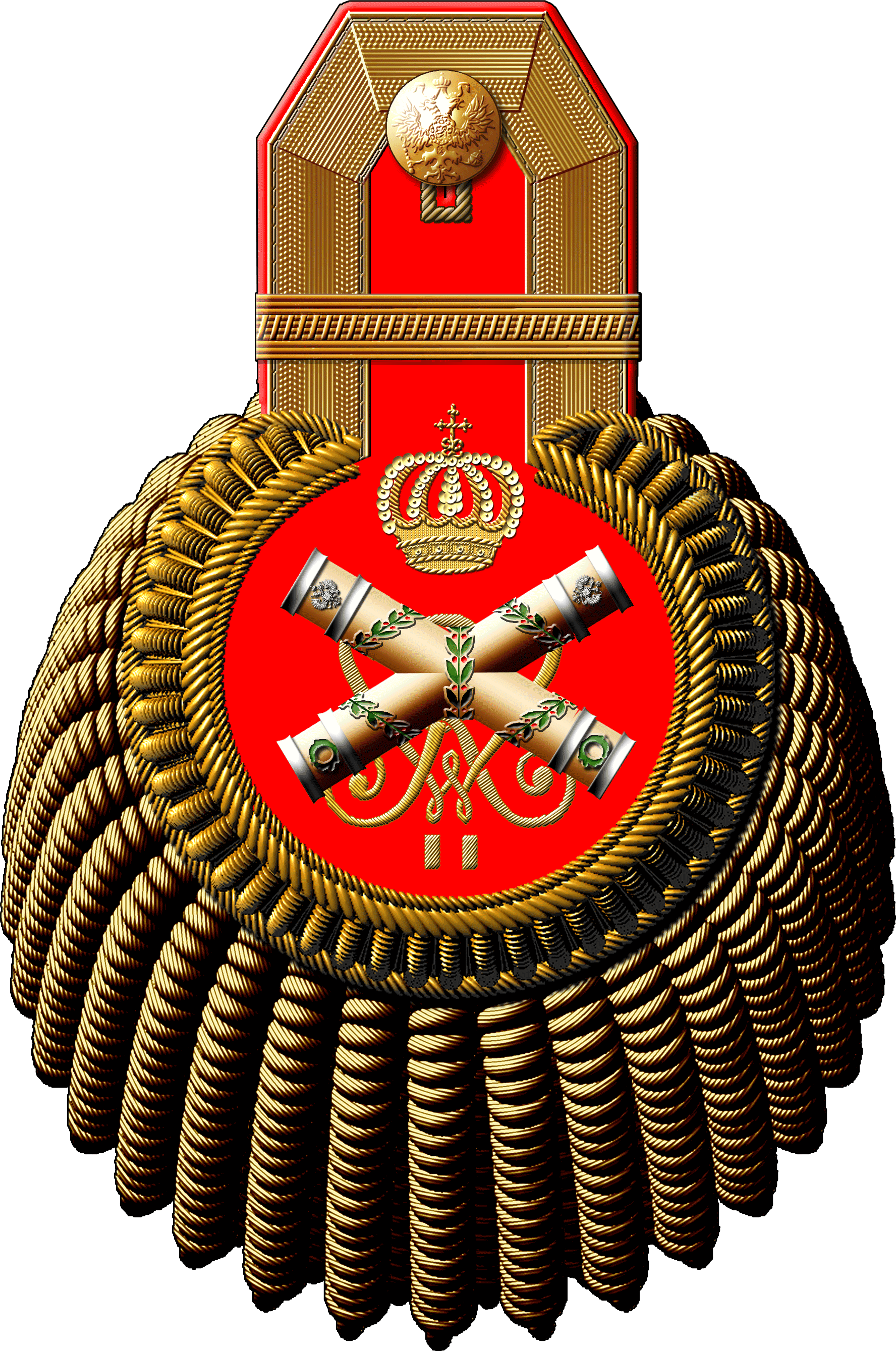
Epaulette of Field marshal of Russian Vyborg 85th Infantry Regiment of German Emperor Wilhelm II

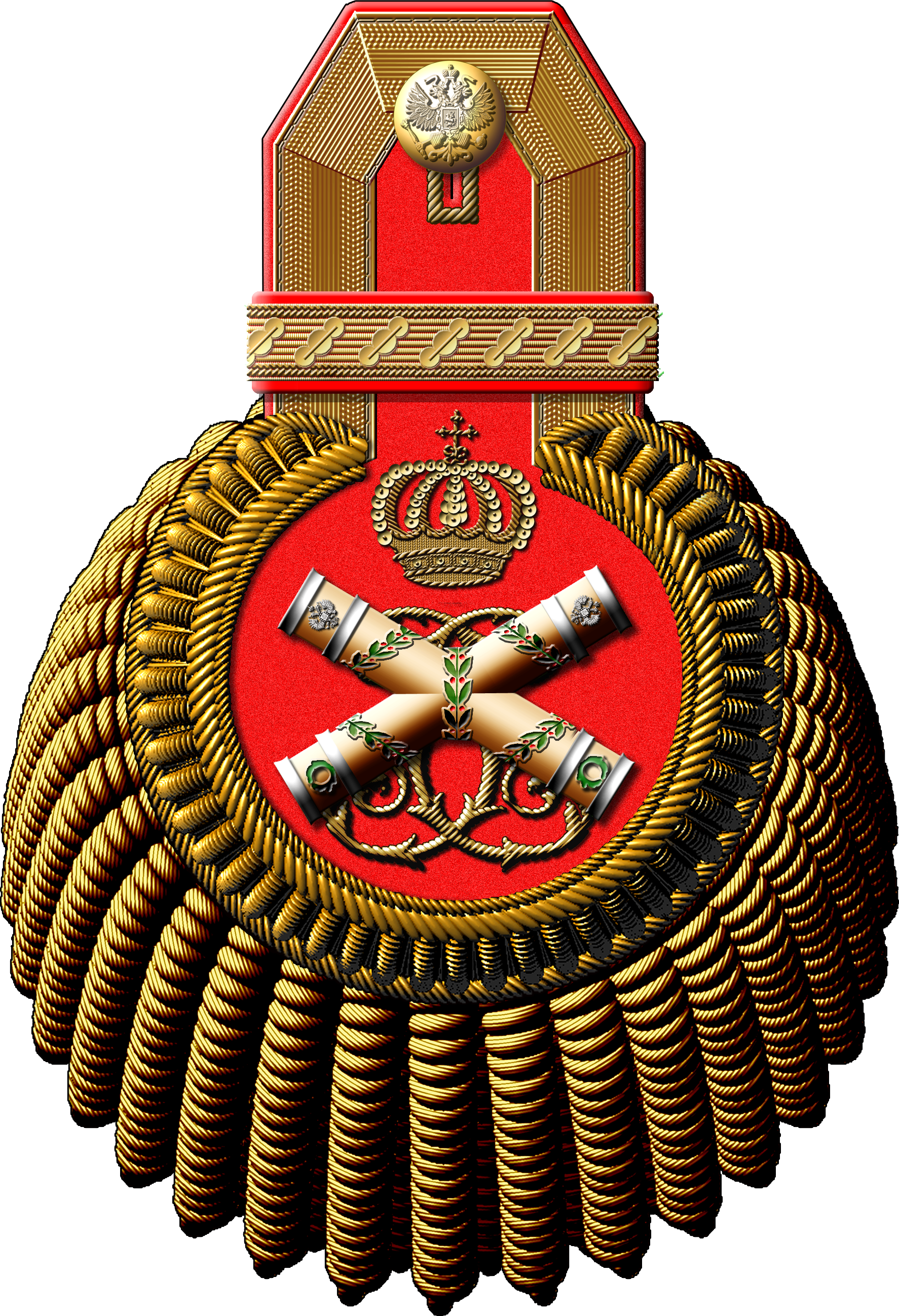
Epaulette of Field marshal of Russian Vologda 18th Infantry Regiment of Romanian King Carol I

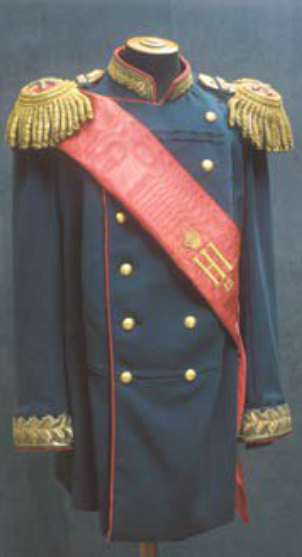
Uniform of Field marshal of Russian 15th Firing Regiment of Montenegrin King Nicholas I

Appointed	Portrait	Name	Lifespan
1700		(Holy Roman Empire) Charles Eugène, Duc de Croy	1651–1702
1762		Charles Louis, Duke of Schleswig-Holstein-Sonderburg-Beck	1690–1774
1774		Louis IX of Hesse-Darmstadt	1719–1790
1818		(United Kingdom of Great Britain and Ireland) Arthur Wellesley, 1st Duke of Wellington	1769–1852
1836		(Austrian Empire) Josef Graf zu Radetzky von Radetz	1766–1858
1837		(Austrian Empire) Archduke Johann of Austria	1782–1859
1872		(German Empire) Helmuth Graf von Moltke	1800–1891
1872		(Austria-Hungary) Archduke Albrecht of Austria	1817–1895
1872		(German Empire) Albert, Crown Prince of Saxony	1828–1902
1872		(German Empire) Prince Friedrich Karl Alexander of Prussia	1801–1883
1872		(German Empire) Prince Friedrich Karl Nikolaus of Prussia	1828–1885
1872		(German Empire) Prince Friedrich Heinrich Albrecht of Prussia	1809–1872
1872		(German Empire) Crown Prince Friedrich of Prussia	1831–1888
1888		(German Empire) Emperor Wilhelm II of Germany	1859–1941
1910		(Kingdom of Montenegro) King Nicholas I of Montenegro	1841–1921
1912		(Kingdom of Romania) King Carol I of Romania	1839–1914

== See also ==
- History of Russian military ranks
- Generalissimo of the Soviet Union
- Marshal of the Soviet Union
- Marshal of the Russian Federation
- List of field marshals
