= Battle of Bucharest (1771) =

Battle in the Russo-Turkish war

- Part of the Russo-Turkish War (1768–1774)
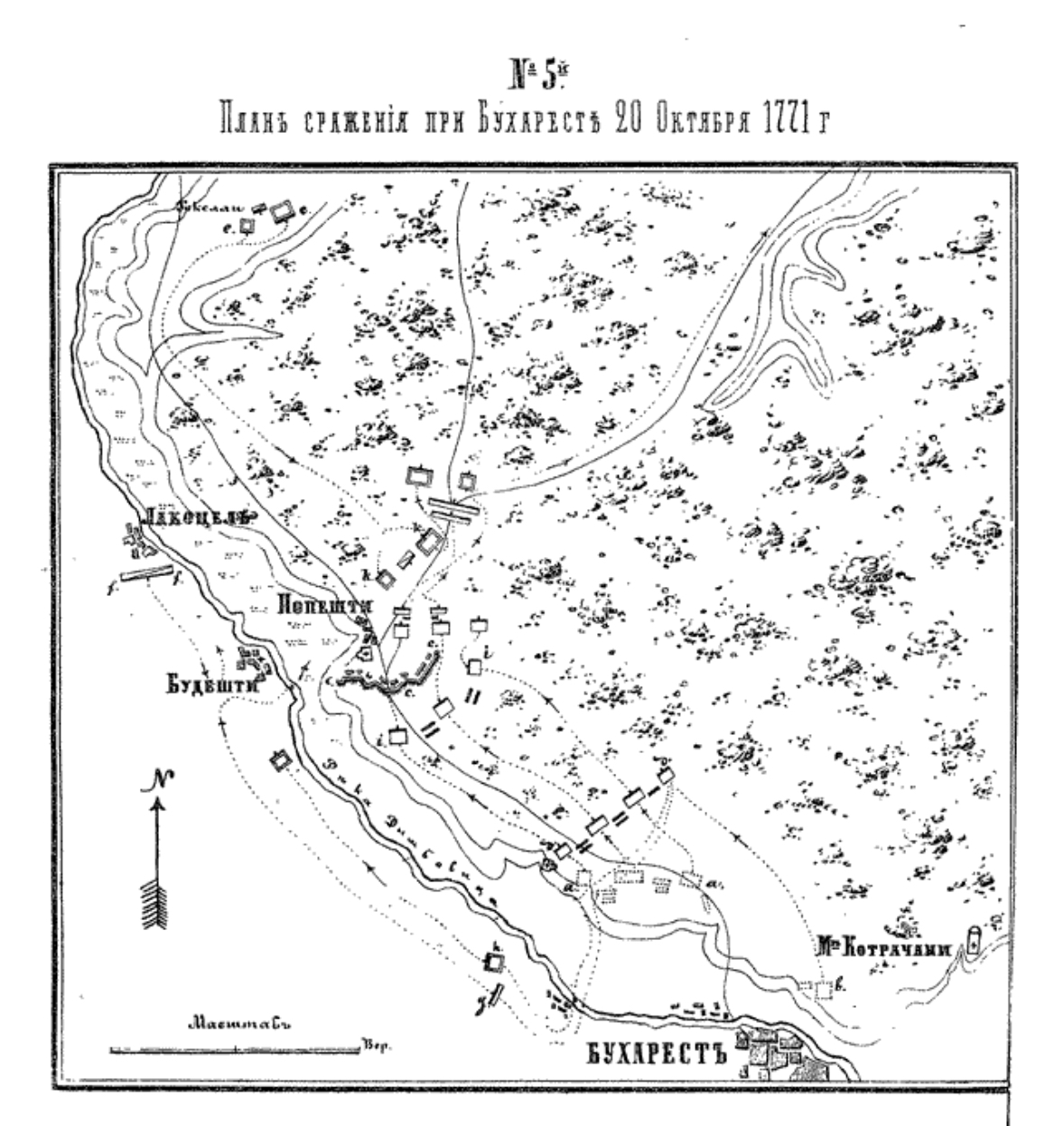
- Battle plan
Date	20 October 1771
Location	Bucharest, Ottoman Empire (present-day Romania)
Result	Russian victory

Belligerents
Russia	Ottoman Empire

Commanders and leaders
Reinhold Essen; Ivan Gudovich	Ahmet Pasha

Strength
13,000	37,000 to 48,000 (Note: 7,000 to 8,000 infantry 30,000 to 40,000 cavalry)

Casualties and losses
55 dead 199 wounded	2,000 dead 350 captured

The Battle of Bucharest took place on 20 October 1771 and was an important event of the Russo-Turkish war. It occurred when the Ottomans tried to recapture Bucharest from the Russians.

In the summer of 1771, Russia launched an offensive against the Turkish positions along the Danube, attacking Giurgiu, but this turned out to be unsuccessful and the initiative in actions passed to the Ottomans.

By autumn, Ottoman forces along the Danube were ready to invade Wallachia, where the Russians had a limited number of soldiers. Nevertheless, they were defeated in the subsequent battle of Bucharest and retreated.

== Background ==
=== Previous events ===
In the winter of 1771, the Russians invaded the right bank of the Danube and occupied the city of Giurgiu, leaving a small garrison there. This garrison could not resist the siege of the Turks in May and surrendered the city. The new commander of the Bucharest division, Reinhold Essen, tried to recapture the city in August, though unsuccessfully due to his small force.

=== Plans and forces of the parties ===
The Ottomans assembled an army of between 37,000 and 48,000 to completely occupy Wallachia. They were to be opposed by one division under the command of Reinhold Essen which had 13,000 men available.

== Battle ==
General Reinhold Essen arranged his infantry in three squares between which he placed the cavalry. The Turks were slowly advancing towards the Russian positions and Essen himself ordered an attack. The Ottomans, who did not expect the attack of the Russian troops, were confused, but then counterattacked with their cavalry. Part of their forces moved from the front, and the others began to carry out a flank raid on Bucharest, which was left almost without cover. Having bypassed the positions of Essen, the Turkish cavalry crossed to the left bank of the Dâmbovița River and rushed towards Bucharest. This maneuver was noticed in a timely manner. Shortly thereafter, a detachment of Ivan Gudovich with artillery repulsed the attack of the Turkish cavalry. Having secured himself from the left flank, Essen attacked the Turkish retrenchment with three squares. In the course of a joint infantry and cavalry attack supported by artillery, as well as a detour from the left flank of Kantemir, the Turkish infantry was knocked out of the fortification and fled.

== Aftermath ==
The Russians casualties were 55 dead and 199 wounded, whereas the Turkish casualties were 2,000 dead and 350 prisoners, of which 200 were Serbs, Bulgarians and Bosniaks. Despite the victory, Essen was unable to organize a normal pursuit to inflict even more damage, but he was able to march all the way to Giurgiu, which he had unsuccessfully stormed earlier. The Russians took 50 guns in the city and occupies it. The defeat did not allow the Turkish command to seize the initiative in the 1771 campaign and capture Bucharest. on October 24, 1771, a cavalry detachment of Lieutenant Colonel D. K. Cantemir (up to 1.5 thousand people) took Zhurzha almost without resistance, capturing 50 guns. Von Essen did not have enough forces to pursue and completely defeat the Turks, but the left bank of the Danube was cleared of Turkish troops.
