= Siege of Giurgiu =

Siege of Giurgiu may refer to:

- Siege of Giurgiu (1770), during the Russo-Turkish War of 1768–1774
- Siege of Giurgiu (1771), during the Russo-Turkish War of 1768–1774
- Capture of Giurgiu (1771), during the Russo-Turkish War of 1768–1774
- Storming of Giurgiu (1771), during the Russo-Turkish War of 1768–1774
- Siege of Giurgiu (1790), during the Austro-Turkish War of 1788–1791
