= Highest military ranks =

Most senior military officer of a country

In many nations, the highest military ranks are classed as being equivalent to, or are officially described as, five-star ranks. However, a number of nations have used or proposed ranks such as generalissimo, which are senior to their five-star equivalent ranks.

== Forms ==
=== Generalissimo and Generalissimus ===
Generalissimus of the Soviet Union

Adopted from Italian (generalissimo) and Latin (generalissimus), the rank titles literally mean "the utmost general". A number of countries, including the Republic of China, France, Russia, Venezuela, Brazil, Portugal, Spain, Cuba, Mexico, Dominican Republic, Sweden, Kingdom of Hawai'i and the USSR, have used these ranks. In most of these countries, the rank has only been held by one or two men.

=== Grand marshal ===
The militaries of the Empire of Japan, Republic of China and North Korea use the rank of grand marshal (traditional Chinese and Japanese: 大元帥; ; Tongyong Pinyin: da yuan shuai; rōmaji: dai-gensui; Korean: 대원수; romaja: taewonsu).

=== Six-star ranks ===
The United States Armed Forces have proposed and used two six-star ranks: General of the Armies and Admiral of the Navy. These are ranked directly above their five-star counterparts, General of the Army and Fleet Admiral.

== By nation ==
=== China (PRC and ROC) ===
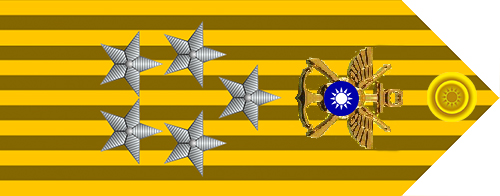
General Special Class

Da yuan shuai

During the early years of the Republic of China, three individuals assumed the rank of "grand marshal of the army and navy" (陸海軍大元帥): Yuan Shikai in 1913, Sun Yat-sen in 1917 and Zhang Zuolin in 1927. The rank of "general special class" or "generalissimo" (特級上將) was awarded to Chiang Kai-shek in 1935. No one in the People's Republic of China has ever been awarded the rank, though the supreme rank of "grand marshal of the People's Republic of China" (中華人民共和國大元帥 zhōnghuá rénmín gònghéguó dà yuánshuài) was proposed for Mao Zedong after the establishment of the People's Republic in 1949, but was never conferred.

=== France ===
Marshal of France

==== Maréchal général ====
The title Maréchal général des camps et armées du roi ("Marshal General of the King's camps and armies") was given to signify that the recipient had authority over all the French armies in the days when a marshal usually governed only one army. This dignity was bestowed only on Marshals of France, usually when the dignity of Constable of France was unavailable or, after 1626, suppressed.

==== Maréchal de France ====
Marshal of France (French: Maréchal de France, plural Maréchaux de France) is a military distinction in contemporary France, not a military rank but is granted to generals for exceptional achievements. It was one of the great officers of the Crown of France during the Ancien Régime and Bourbon Restoration and one of the great dignitaries of the Empire during the First French Empire (when the title was not "marshal of France" but was "marshal of the Empire").

==== Maréchal d'Empire ====
"Marshal of the Empire" (French: Maréchal d'Empire) was a civil dignity during the First French Empire. It was created by Sénatus-consulte on 18 May 1804 and to a large extent resurrected the formerly abolished title of marshal of France. According to the Sénatus-consulte, a marshal was a grand officer of the Empire, entitled to a high-standing position at the court and to the presidency of an electoral college.

=== Italy ===
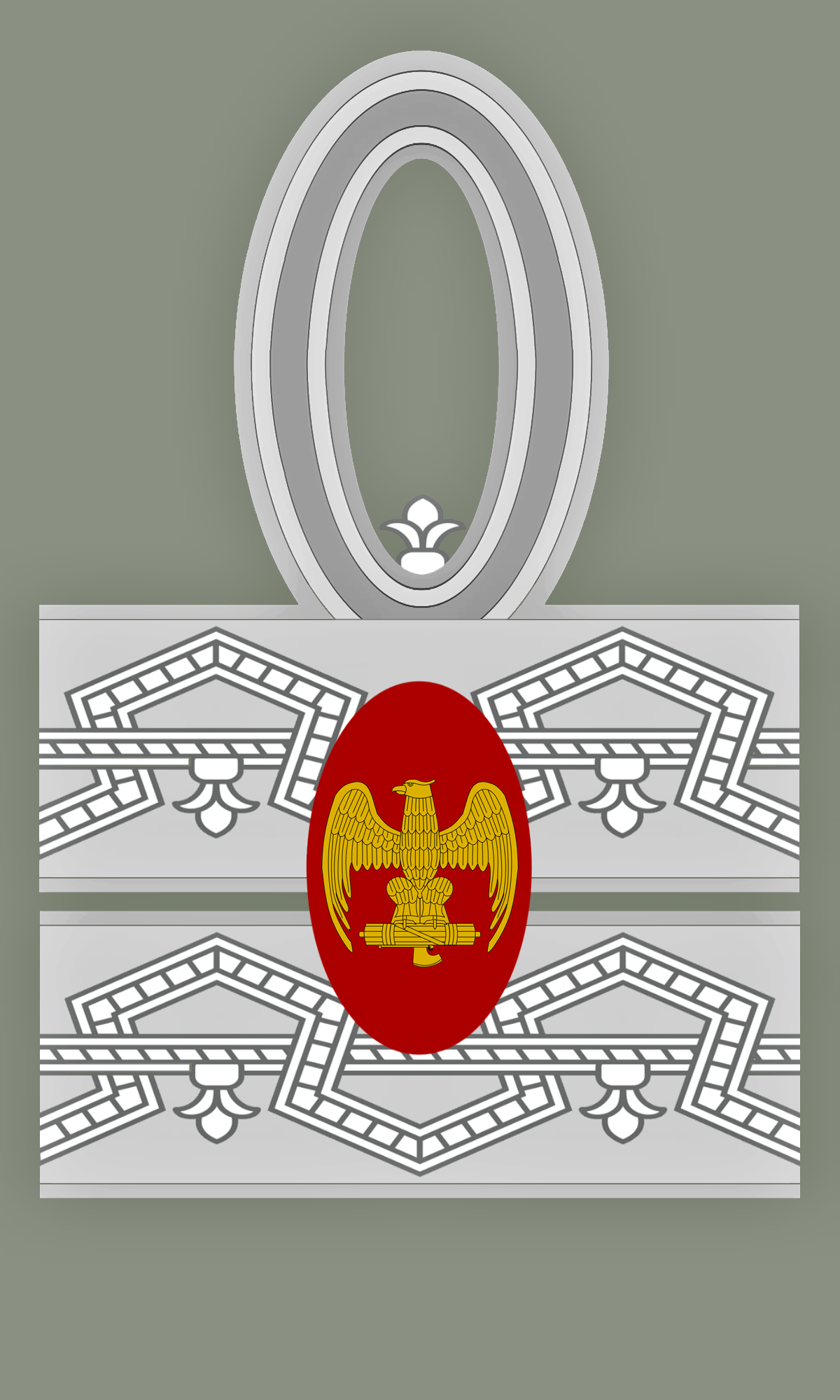
Italian "First marshal of the empire"

The Italian rank of "first marshal of the Empire" was granted in 1938 to Benito Mussolini and King Victor Emmanuel III, who remain the only holders, as the rank (and the Italian Empire) was abolished after World War II.

=== Japan ===
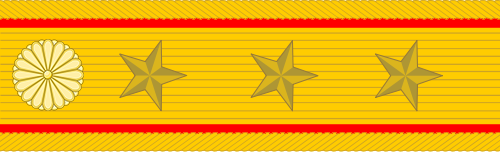
Dai-gensui

The Japanese rank of dai-gensui ("grand marshal") was held by the Emperor of Japan in his capacity as commander-in-chief of the Imperial Japanese Army (from 1889 to 1945), and was abolished in 1947. It was held by three people: Emperor Meiji, Emperor Taishō, and Emperor Shōwa.

=== Nazi Germany ===
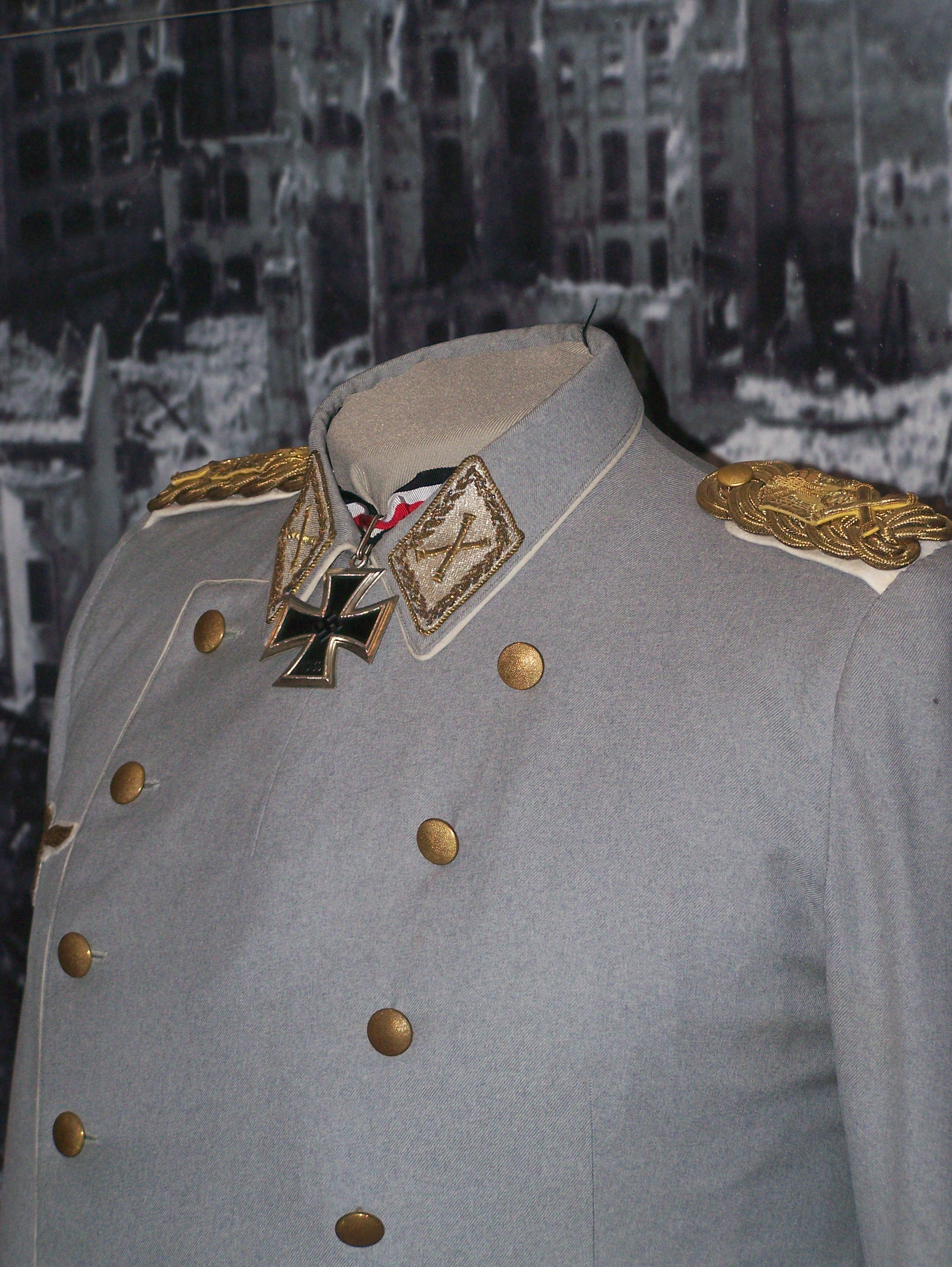
Göring's uniform

Reichsmarschall (Hermann Göring)

In 1940 Nazi Germany, Hermann Göring was promoted by Adolf Hitler to Reichsmarschall, the highest rank in the armed forces of Nazi Germany during World War II (after the position of supreme commander, which was held by Hitler himself). Göring was the only person to hold this rank in modern times.

The rank of Reichsmarschall was originally created before the 12th century, during the time of the Holy Roman Empire. Historically, holding the rank of Reichsmarschall was neither unique nor as prestigious as it was during World War II. During the time of the German Empire and World War I, no one in the German armed forces held this rank.

=== North Korea ===
==== Taewonsu ====
The highest rank in North Korea is taewonsu and is intended to be an honorific title for the nation's leaders. Its insignia is based on the North Korean wonsu insignia, but with an added crest. The rank was created in 1992 when it was awarded to Kim Il Sung, who was the only holder until 2012, when his successor Kim Jong Il was awarded the title posthumously. It is a seven-star equivalent rank.

==== Wonsu ====
The rank of wonsu is the highest military rank except taewonsu. Its insignia is a large single star, based on the insignia of marshal of the Soviet Union which is itself based on the marshal's star. North Koreans awarded the rank of wonsu have included: Kim Jong Il (1992), O Jin U (1992), Choe Kwang (1995) and Ri Ul-sol (1995). Rank of marshal with the title "marshal of the Democratic People's Republic of Korea" (konghwaguk wonsu) is superior to "marshal of the Korean People's Army" (wonsu).

==== Chasu ====
North Korea also maintains a rank of chasu, senior to the four-star rank of daejang, but junior to wonsu.

Taewonsu

Konghwaguk wonsu

Wonsu

Chasu

=== Paraguay ===
The Spanish rank mariscal presidente de los ejércitos (English: "marshal president of the armies") was a rank given by the Paraguayan Congress to Francisco Solano López at the beginning of the Paraguayan War. It is equivalent to the rank of grand marshal. López remains the only Paraguayan that was ranked as a marshal during his lifetime and also the only one with the title mariscal presidente de los ejércitos. José Félix Estigarribia posthumously received the rank of field marshal.

=== Russian Federation ===
Marshal of the Russian Federation (Russian: Маршал Российской Федерации, romanized: Marshal Rossiyskoy Federatsii) is the highest military rank of Russia, created in 1993 following the dissolution of the Soviet Union.

=== South Korea ===
In South Korea wonsu is considered a five-star rank, and uses an insignia based on the five-star insignia of the U.S. General of the Army.

=== Soviet Union ===
The rank of "generalissimus of the Soviet Union" was created on 27 June 1945, and granted to Joseph Stalin, who never actually wore the insignia; instead, his Marshal tunic had a special design different from the regular military uniform of a Marshal. He was the only person ever to hold the rank.

=== United States ===
Dewey's admiral of the Navy insignia

==== Admiral of the Navy ====
George Dewey was promoted to the U.S. rank of admiral of the Navy on March 24, 1903, with effect from March 2, 1899. In 1944 the Navy Department declared Dewey's rank to be senior to the then newly created five-star rank of fleet admiral.

During the preparations for the invasion of Japan, a proposal was raised by the Navy Department to appoint Chester Nimitz to the rank of admiral of the Navy, or grant him some equivalent rank. The proposal, however, was dropped after the Japanese surrender.

==== General of the Armies of the United States ====
John Pershing was promoted to "General of the Armies" in 1919, from what was then the highest rank, the four-star rank of general. Under the regulations of the time, he was permitted to choose his insignia, and he chose four gold stars, in contrast to the four silver stars used by U.S. general and admiral rank insignia.

In 1976, as part of the American Bicentennial celebrations, a joint resolution of the U.S. Congress stated that "it is considered fitting and proper that no officer of the United States Army should outrank Lieutenant General George Washington". Hence, it was resolved that "the grade of General of the Armies of the United States (be) established" and George Washington be posthumously appointed to this grade. President Ulysses S. Grant, who served as a general in the American Civil War prior to his presidency, was also posthumously promoted to this rank on 23 December 2022, the bicentenary of his birth.

== See also ==
- Magister militum
- Spahbod
- Constable of France
- Grand Domestic
- Shōgun
- Supreme Headquarters Allied Expeditionary Force
- Supreme Allied Commander
- Dux bellorum
- Grand marshal
- Six-star rank
- Hetman
- Chom Thap Thai
- Generalissimo
- Marshal General of France
- First marshal of the empire
- Admiralissimo
