= Field Marshals' Hall of the Winter Palace =

Historic room of the Winter Palace, Saint Petersburg, Russia

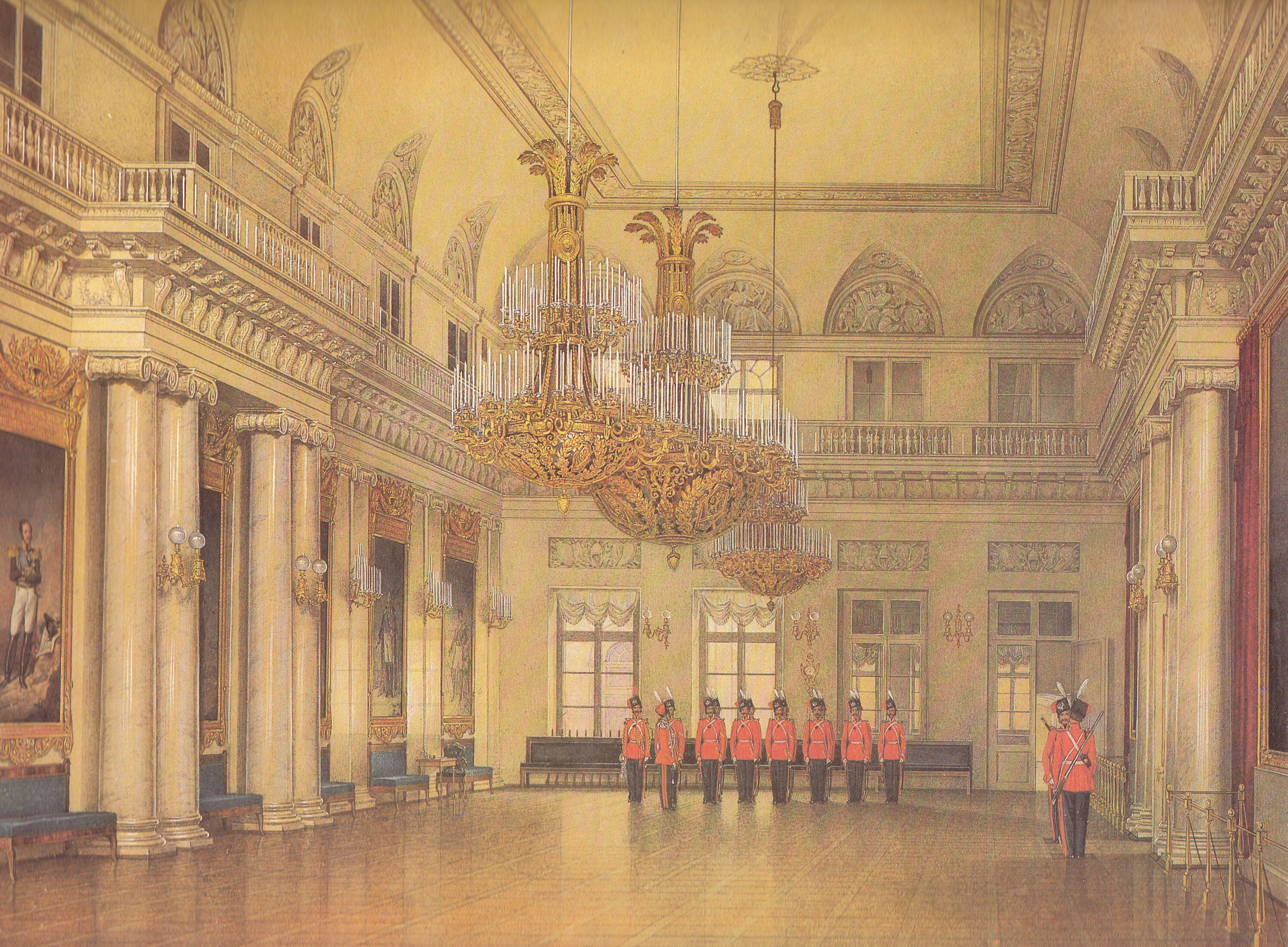
The Field Marshals' Hall, the Winter Palace, St Petersburg, by Eduard Hau (1866)

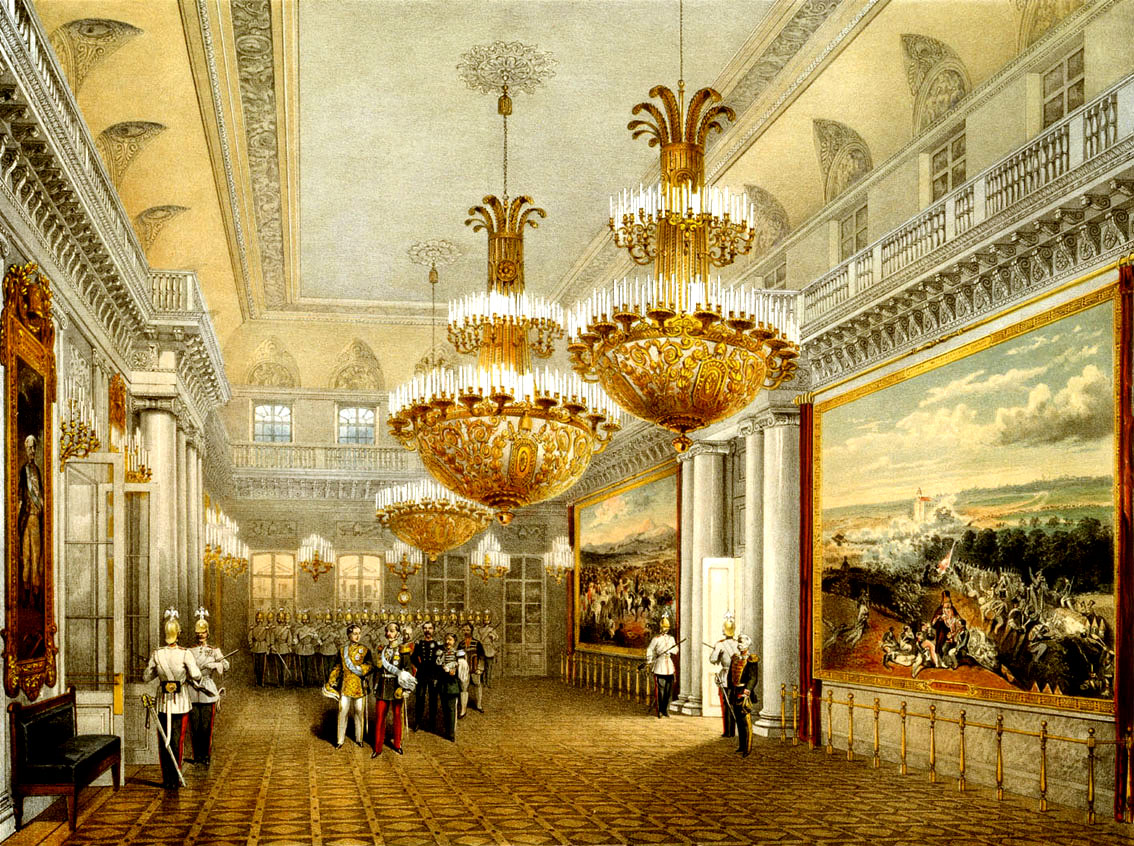
Field Marshals' Hall, painted by Vasily Sadovnikov

The Field Marshals' Hall (Russian: Фельдмаршальский зал) of the Winter Palace in Saint Petersburg was built to honor the greatest military leaders of the Russian Empire—generals who attained the rank of Field Marshal. (The only higher rank was that of Generalissimo, attained by four generals and, in the Soviet period, bestowed on Joseph Stalin).

This great hall and the adjacent throne room are part of the suite of rooms that were created in the western part of the Winter Palace for Tsar Nicholas I in 1833 by architect Auguste de Montferrand.

The great fire, which destroyed the interior of the Winter Palace, began in this hall on 17 December 1837. It destroyed all in its path for over thirty hours. Following the fire, the hall was rebuilt in its original style by the architect Vasily Stasov.

Today, as part of the Hermitage Museum, this room retains its recreated decoration by Stasov.
