= Star rank =

Star rank may refer to:

- A number of military rank designations in various countries
  - Six-star rank
  - Five-star rank
  - Four-star rank
  - Three-star rank
  - Two-star rank
- Ranks in the Boy Scouts of America § Star

== See related ==
Star (heraldry)
