= Battle of Arpachai =

1807 battle of the Russo-Turkish War

- Part of the Russo-Turkish War (1806–1812)
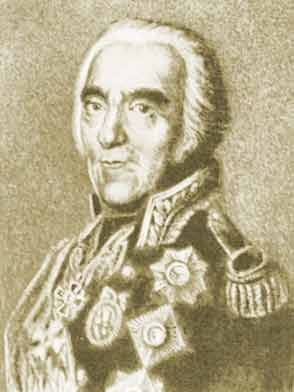
- Ivan Gudovich
Date	18 June 1807
Location	Akhurian River, Armenia
Result	Russian victory

Belligerents
(Russia) Russian Empire	Ottoman Empire

Commanders and leaders
(Russia) Ivan Gudovich	Yusuf Pasha

Strength
7,000 soldiers	20,000 soldiers

Casualties and losses
14 deaths, 71 injuries	1,000+ deaths, 12 cannons lost

The Battle of Arpachai took place on 18 June 1807 on the Akhurian River in Armenia during the Russo-Turkish War (1806–1812). It was fought between a 7,000-man Russian force under Count Ivan Gudovich and more than 20,000 Ottoman force under Yusuf Pasha. The offensive was repelled by the Russian forces.

== Books ==
Potto, Vasily (1901). Утверждение русского владычества на Кавказе. Vol. 1. Tiflis: Типография Я. И. Либермана. p. 286.
