= Fire in the Winter Palace =

1837 fire in Saint Petersburg, Russian Empire

Coordinates: 59.9404°N 30.3139°E

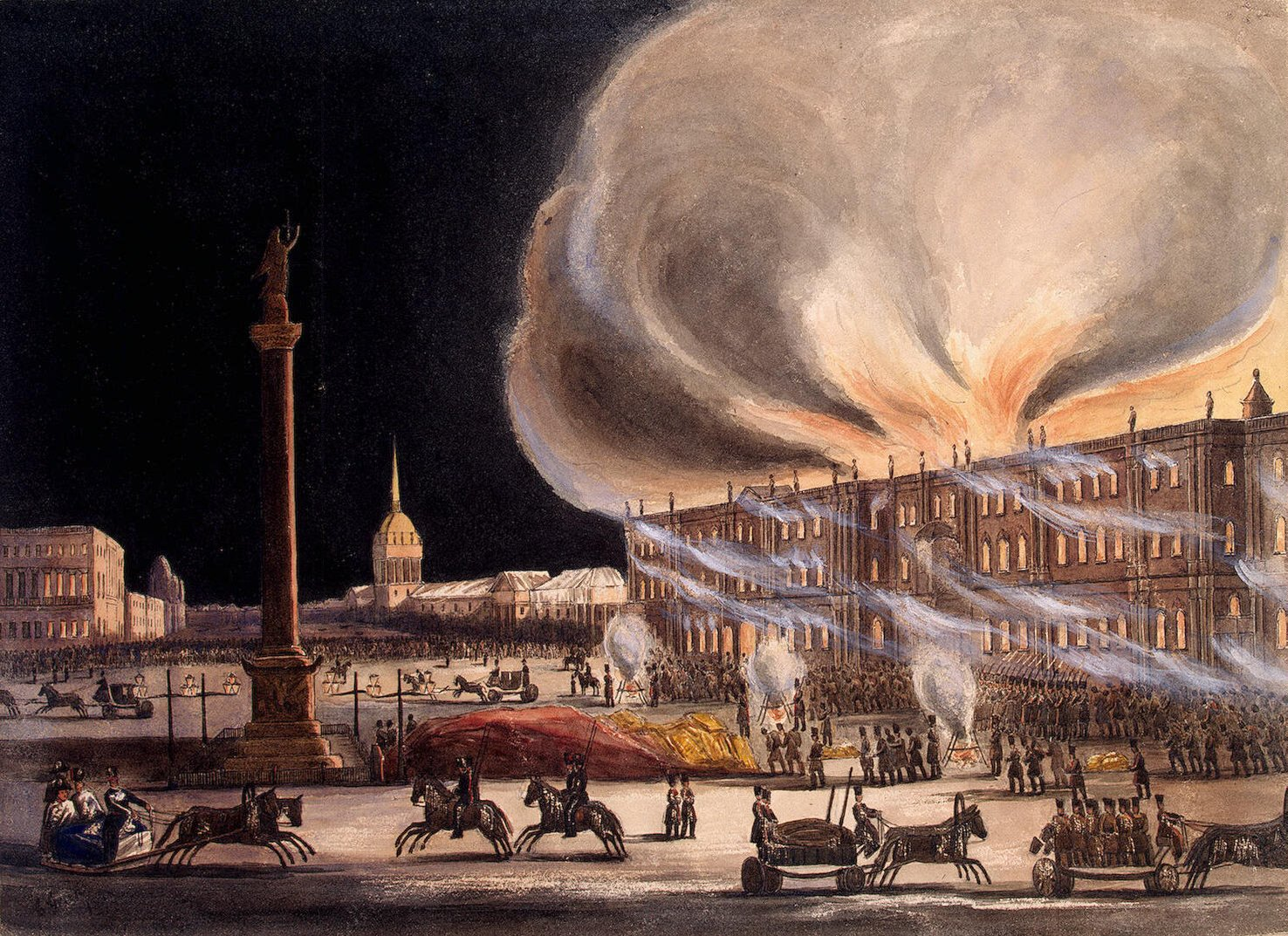
- Fire in the Winter Palace, 1837, Watercolour by B. Green, 1838
- Date: December 13, 1837
- Duration: 3 days
- Location: Winter Palace of Saint Petersburg
- Cause: Soot inflammation
- Deaths: 30

The fire in the Winter Palace of Saint Petersburg, then the official residence of the Russian emperors, occurred on December 17, 1837, and was caused by soot inflammation.

The Palace burned for three days, and the glow was visible for 50–70 versts (50–75 km; 31–47 mi). Thirty guardsmen died in the fire, although nearly all the items were saved (notably the imperial throne, guards banners, portraits of Russian generals from the Field Marshals' Hall and Military Gallery and the utensils of the Grand Church).

== Events ==
The fire broke out after smoke from an unswept chimney had seeped through an unchoked vent in a partition between the wooden and main walls in the Field Marshal's Hall. The wall began to smoulder and a fire broke out in the roof of the Small Throne Room of the Winter Palace. The dry-waxed floors and the oil-painted fretwork caught fire immediately.

The Court was at the Mikhailovsky Theatre when an aide-de-camp entered the imperial box and informed Prince Volkonsky, one of the ministers then present. The prince gave him orders and continued to look quietly on at the performance. Half-an-hour later the aide-de-camp returned, and this time the prince spoke to the Emperor Nicholas I.

To prevent the fire from spreading to the Hermitage, Nicholas I called for the immediate dismantling of the gallery roofs which joined the Hermitage with the main building. However, the fire fighting was hindered when the privy-councilor of the Empress, Chambeau, stated: "Everything here belongs to the Empress! Not a thing must be broken!"

A battalion of the Preobrazhensky Lifeguard Regiment was the first military unit to arrive from amongst the troops situated nearby. The retired Major-General Baranovich told later how the 10th Navy Crew's private Nestor Troyanov and the commissary department joiner Abram Dorofeev managed to save the image of the Christ the Saviour from the already burning iconostasis. Each man was awarded three hundred rubles, with Troyanov being transferred to the Guards.

The official reports stated that there were no casualties until an eyewitness, Kolokoltsov, revealed the figures in 1882.

== Restoration ==
The facades and parade halls were restored by Vasily Stasov and inner rooms by Alexander Briullov. In 1838–39 the fire walls, new stone and cast-iron staircases as well as new funnels were installed. All the wood was replaced by iron, cast-iron and brick. By the end of 1838 the expenses on these works exceeded 100,000 rubles.

== See also ==
- Winter Palace § Fire of 1837
