= Admiral of the Navy =

Rank in the United States Navy

- Insignia for Admiral of the Navy (1899–1917)
- Country: United States
- Service branch: United States Navy
- Rank group: Flag officer
- Formation: March 24, 1903 (retroactive to March 2, 1899)
- Abolished: January 16, 1917
- Next lower rank: Admiral
- Equivalent ranks: Fleet admiral

Admiral of the Navy was the highest-possible rank in the United States Navy, prior to the creation of fleet admiral in 1944. The rank is considered to be at least equivalent to that of a five-star admiral, with Admiral George Dewey being the only officer to be appointed to the rank.

== History ==
=== Post-Spanish American War ===
The rank has only been awarded once, to George Dewey, in recognition of his victory at Manila Bay in 1898. On March 2, 1899, Congress approved the creation of the grade of Admiral of the Navy. On March 3, President McKinley transmitted to the Senate his nomination of Dewey for the new grade, which was approved the same day. But McKinley's nomination had used the term "Admiral in the Navy," while the act creating the new grade had used "Admiral of the Navy." On March 14, 1903, this discrepancy was addressed when President Roosevelt nominated and the Senate approved Dewey to the grade of "Admiral of the Navy," retroactive to March 2, 1899. The Navy Register of 1904 listed Dewey for the first time as "Admiral of the Navy" instead of "Admiral."

Though this clarified the grade's unique title, the precedence of the new rank was still considered "four star", equivalent to general in the army, in the US Navy Regulations of 1909. In the U.S. Navy Regulations of 1913, the gun salute for Admiral of the Navy was set to 19, the equivalent salute for a British field marshal or admiral of the fleet. More four-star officers were appointed after an act authorizing the temporary grade of admiral for three fleet commanders-in-chief was passed in 1915.

In terms of insignia, Dewey appears in a photograph soon after his promotion wearing the sleeve stripes last worn by Admiral David Dixon Porter, which are the same as present-day admirals (one two-inch band with three half-inch stripes above). When a new edition of US Navy Uniform Regulations was issued in May 1899, the sleeve insignia for admiral was specified as "two strips of 2-inch gold lace, with one 1-inch strip between, set one-quarter of an inch apart." In the 1905 Uniform Regulations, a similar description was used but with the title "Admiral of the Navy." The collar and shoulder insignia were four silver stars, with gold foul anchors under the two outermost stars. Unlike other U.S. four-star insignia, the stars pointed inwards to the center of the insignia, not upwards.

=== World War II ===
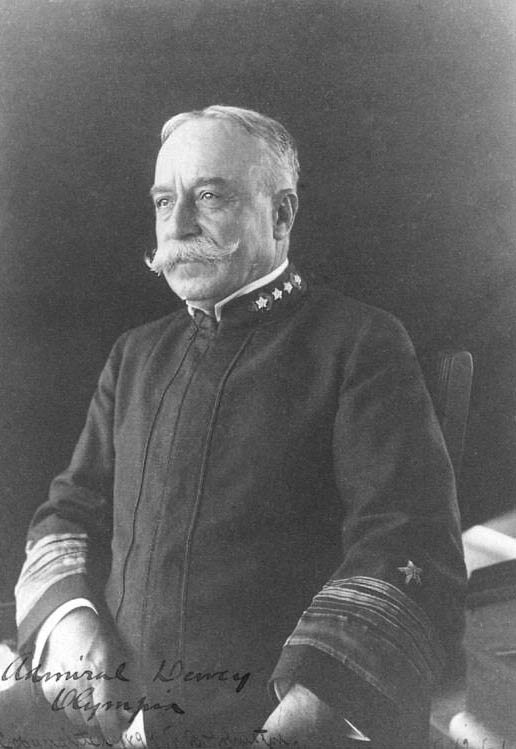
Dewey, Admiral of the Navy, pictured in 1899 on board USS Olympia

In 1944, with the establishment of the rank of fleet admiral, the Department of the Navy specified in a Bureau of Navigation memo that "the rank of Fleet Admiral of the United States Navy shall be considered the senior most rank of the United States Navy". As Dewey had been deceased for nearly thirty years, no comparison between his rank and that of fleet admiral was made until 1945. At that time, during the preparations for Operation Downfall, the proposed invasion of Japan, the possibility was raised of promoting one of the serving United States Fleet Admirals to "six-star rank" should the Army take a similar measure by promoting Douglas MacArthur to the rank of General of the Armies.

As Congress was trying to create the rank of fleet admiral in 1944, the Navy wanted to re-establish and elevate Admiral of the Navy be equivalent to General of the Armies, but it could not legally do so without a congressional act. The Navy's chief of naval personnel, Vice Admiral Randall Jacobs, testified before the Committee on Naval Affairs of the House of Representatives, recommending that the rank of Admiral of the Navy should be made equivalent to General of the Armies, but a previous bill submitted for its re-establishment on February 25, 1944, failed to be passed into law. Congress passed Pub.L. 78-482 on December 14, 1944, creating the rank of fleet admiral, without re-establishing the rank of Admiral of the Navy. As such, the rank remained nonexistent. By 1955, the Navy concluded that the rank was honorary. And while it held to the belief that the rank was equivalent to General of the Armies, the Navy amended its regulations to establish fleet admiral as its highest achievable rank, adhering to the standard set by the law.

== Text of Act ==
The act to create the grade of Admiral of the Navy read as follows:

Be it enacted by the Senate and the House of Representatives of the United States of America in Congress assembled, That the President is hereby authorized to appoint, by selection and promotion, an Admiral of the Navy, who shall not be placed upon the retired list except upon his own application; and whenever such office shall be vacated by death or otherwise the office shall cease to exist.
