= Admiralissimo =

Informal title for a chief naval officer

Admiralissimo is an informal title for a chief naval officer, and is a naval equivalent of generalissimo.

== List of senior naval officers referred to as admiralissimo ==
- Hayreddin Barbarossa – 15th/16th-century Turkish admiral
- John Jellicoe, 1st Earl Jellicoe – British admiral of the fleet
- Lord Charles Beresford – British 19th/20th-century admiral
- Augustin Boué de Lapeyrère – Commander-in-Chief of France's Mediterranean forces
- George Dewey – American Admiral of the Navy
- Deodoro da Fonseca – Brazilian 19th-century admiral
