= Ivan Gudovich =

Russian noble

Count Ivan Gudovich
- Иванъ Гудовичъ
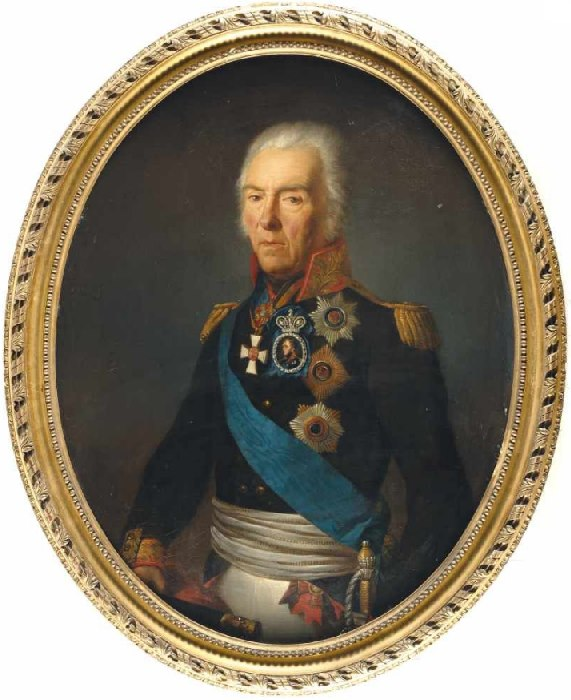

Viceroy of Caucasus
- In office 1790–1796
- Preceded by: Anton de Balmen
- Succeeded by: Valerian Zubov
- In office 1796–1798
- Preceded by: Valerian Zubov
- Succeeded by: Irakli Morkov
- In office 1806–1809
- Preceded by: Pavel Tsitsianov
- Succeeded by: Alexander Tormasov

Viceroy of Southwestern Krai
- In office March 1798 – June 1798
- Preceded by: Andrei Rosenberg
- Succeeded by: Alexander Bekleshov

Military governor of Moscow
- In office 20 August 1809 – 24 May 1812
- Preceded by: Timofey Tupolmin
- Succeeded by: Fyodor Rostopchin

Personal details
- Born: 1741 Old Ivaytenki, Cossack Hetmanate
- Died: January 22, 1820 (aged 78–79) Olhopil, Podolia Governorate, Russian Empire
- Resting place: Saint Sophia Cathedral, Kyiv
- Education: Leipzig University

Military service
- Allegiance: Russian Empire
- Branch/service: Imperial Russian Army
- Commands: Astrakhan 12th Grenadier Regiment; Russian Caucasian corps
- Battles/wars: See list: Russo-Turkish War (1768–1774); Siege of Giurgiu (1771); Storming of Giurgiu (1771); Battle of Bucharest (1771); Sheikh Mansur Movement; Russo-Turkish War (1787–1792); Storming of Anapa; Russo-Turkish War (1806–1812); Battle of Akhalkalaki (1807); Battle of Arpachai; Russo-Persian War; Siege of Erivan

Count Ivan Vasilyevich Gudovich (Russian: Граф Иван Васильевич Гудович, tr. Ivan Vasil’evič Gudovič; 1741–1820) was a Russian noble and military leader of Ukrainian descent. His exploits included the capture of Khadjibey (1789) and the conquest of maritime Dagestan (1807).

== Life ==
Ivan's father was an influential member of the Ukrainian Cossack starshina. He sent his sons to be educated abroad, at the Königsberg Albertina University and the University of Leipzig. Upon coming to St Petersburg in 1759, Gudovich joined the Russian Army, hoping to benefit from the favors enjoyed by his elder brother, Andrey, an aide-de-camp to Peter III.

Upon the latter's dethronement in 1762, the Gudovich brothers were apprehended and briefly imprisoned. It was during the Russo-Turkish War (1768–74) that Ivan Gudovich rose to prominence and greatly distinguished himself at Khotyn, Larga, and Kagul. The next ten years were spent in half-military, half-administrative work in Ryazan, Tambov, and Podolia.

Gudovich won a European reputation for a series of brilliantly conducted sieges during the Russo-Turkish War (1787–92). In 1789 he succeeded in taking the citadel of Khadjibey, which would be renamed Odessa by the imperial administration. He proceeded to capture Kilia, a strong fortress commanding the Danube Delta. When he prepared to lay siege to Izmail, Prince Potemkin had him replaced with Alexander Samoylov. Thereupon Gudovich moved to the Caucasian front, where he stormed the most important Ottoman stronghold, Anapa, and took prisoner its garrison of 13,000 soldiers. (Note: Baddeley, Russian Conquest of the Caucasus, Chapter III gives the garrison as 15000 and says that it was annihilated, the Russians losing half of the 8000 men engaged)

In the wake of such a glorious success, Gudovich's capacity for supreme command could hardly be doubted. He aspired to lead the projected Russian invasion of Persia to redeem himself due to his lack of decisive decision making during the political fallout with khan Agha Mohammad Khan with Georgia in 1795. but the supreme command was given to a young and inexperienced courtier, Valerian Zubov. Embittered, Gudovich entertained plans of retiring from active service. While he was on his furlough, the Empress died and her successor Paul, recalling Ivan's allegiance to his father, had Zubov replaced with Gudovich, who was also made count.

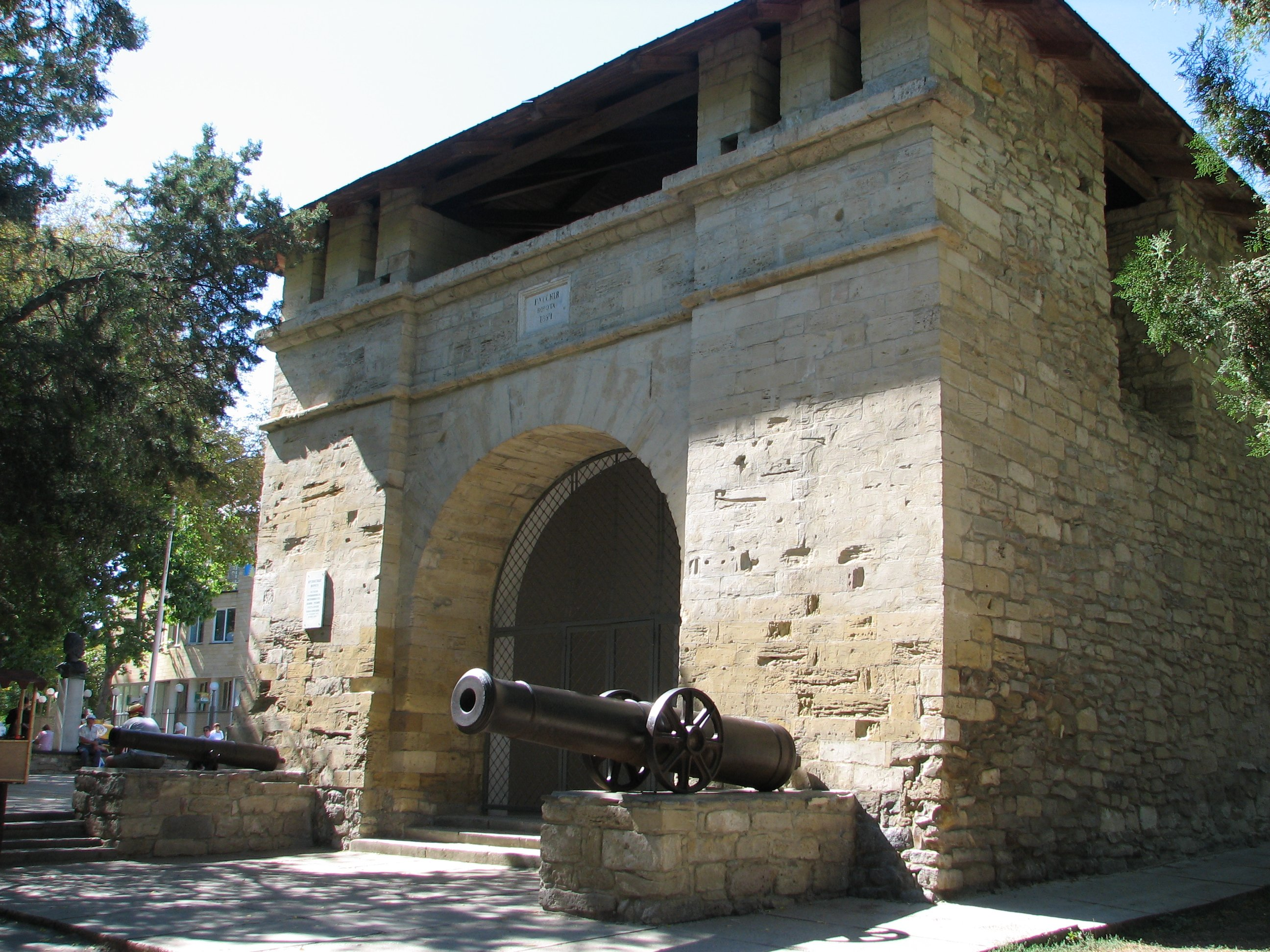
Anapa Fortress, taken by Gudovich in 1791.

By that time, the Persian expedition was over and Gudovich prepared to lead the Russian armies to combat Revolutionary France on the Rhine. The project was abandoned within months, and Gudovich had to languish in retirement until the outbreak of the new war with Persia.

Named commander-in-chief in the Caucasus in 1806, Gudovich led the Russian armies to the Caspian Sea during the Russo-Persian War (1804–13), overrunning the khanates of Derbent, Sheka, and Baku on his way. After the 24,000-strong army of Yusuf Pasha was routed in the Battle of Arpachai, Gudovich was promoted Field Marshal. However, the battle cost him an eye and left him incapacitated for effective command. In 1808, the ailing general failed to take Erivan and retreated with his soldiers to Georgia.

Frustrated with the latest failure, Gudovich laid down all his offices and retired from the army to Moscow, which he governed for three more years, until advanced age forced him to retire to his enormous estates in Podolia, mostly inherited from a father-in-law, Count Kirill Razumovsky. Gudovich died aged 80 and was buried, according to his own wishes, at the Saint Sophia Cathedral in Kiev.
