= Randall Jacobs =

United States Navy officer

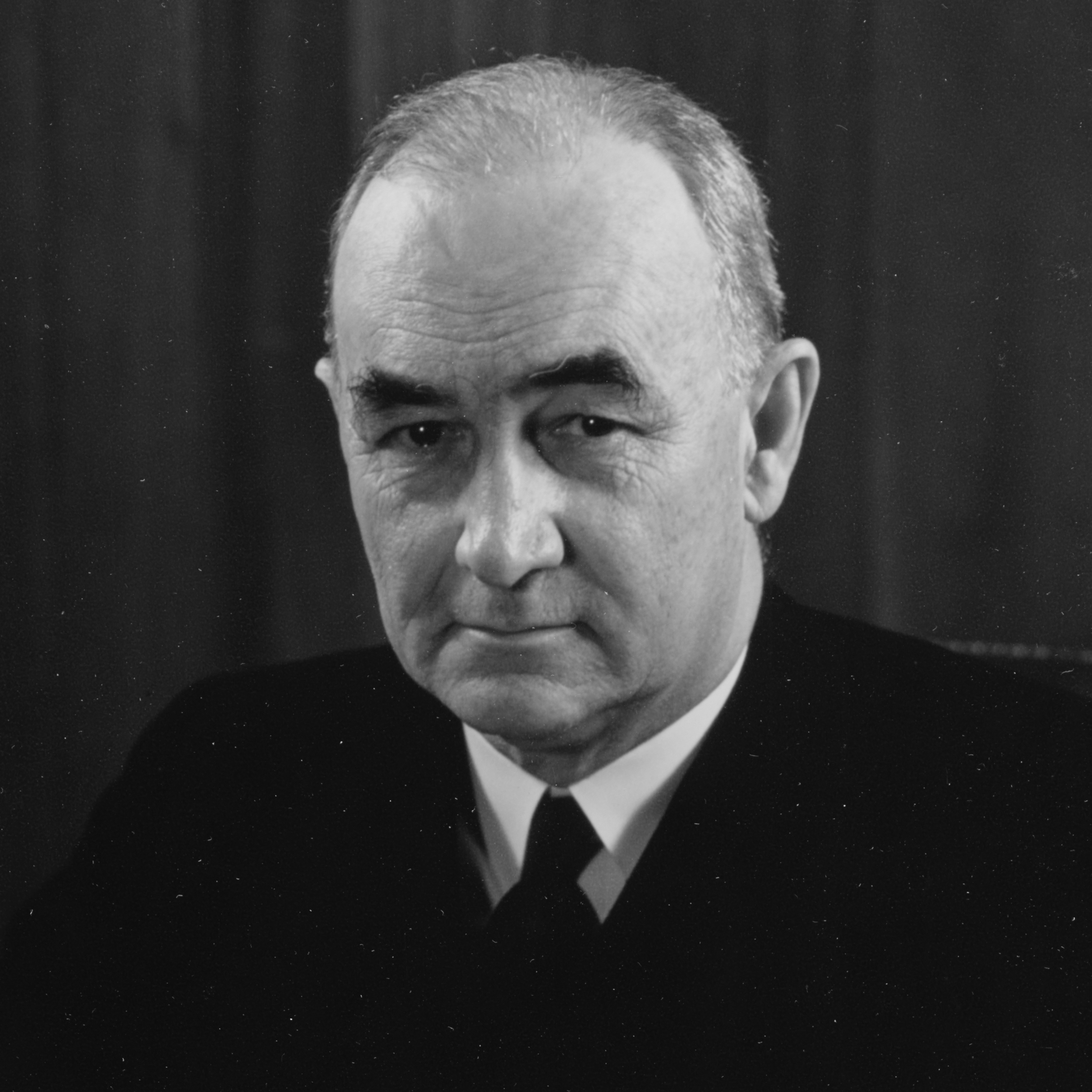
- Born: December 12, 1885
- Died: June 19, 1967 (aged 81)

Randall Jacobs (1885–1967) was a United States Navy officer. He reached the rank of Vice-Admiral.

== Early life and education ==
Jacobs was born on 12 December 1885 at Danville in Pennsylvania. He attended the United States Naval Academy graduating in 1907. He was in the same class as several other future Admirals including John H. Hoover, Augustin T. Beauregard, Patrick N. L. Bellinger, Harold M. Bemis, Richard S. Edwards, Robert C. Giffen, Felix Gygax, Henry K. Hewitt, Jonas H. Ingram, Claud A. Jones, Ernest D. McWhorter, Albert C. Read, and Robert A. Theobald.

== Career ==
In 1927, he was the Commander of the USS Monocacy.

He served as a Commander on USS Black Hawk.

He served as Commander of USS Utah from 1 April 1932 until 3 May 1934.

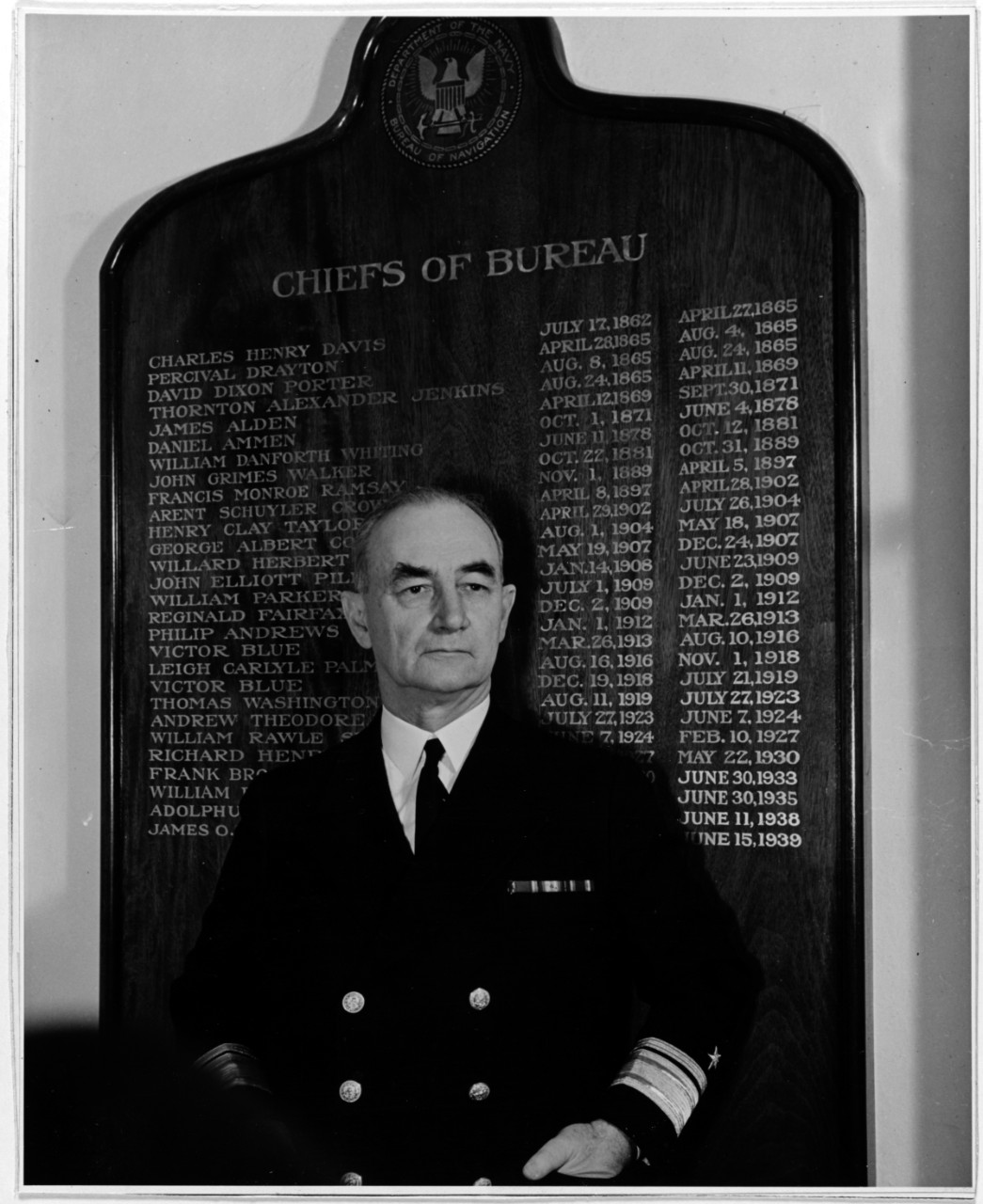
Jacobs on his appointment in charge of the Bureau of Navigation

In December 19 1941, he was appointed Commander of the Bureau of Navigation. While in charge, Jacobs would play a key role in recruitment for the Navy during the Second World War. This included the enlistement of Black men into naval units as a result of discussion with US President Franklin D. Roosevelt, Secretary of the Navy Frank Knox and the director of selective service. Jacobs continued in his role in charge of navigation and recruitment as the organization became the Bureau of Naval Personnel in 1942. In charge of naval personnel during the Second World War, Jacobs name was used in numerous instances to address telegrams to inform the family of naval personnel if an individual was killed or missing. This include telegrams to the family of those lost in the sinking of the USS Indianpolis. However in one case, a telegram was sent in Jacob's name but in error to the parents of a radio technician who was believed missing but in fact had not joined the Indianapolis and therefore survived. In early 1943, Jacobs utilised the reorganized Bureau of Naval Personnel to create a new, standardized, program of training and college education for those in the Navy, including creation of definitive US training manuals for each aspect of naval warfare across 1943 and 1944.

In April 1943, Jacobs proposed to Secretary of the Navy Frank Knox that the US Navy consider an experimental program to enlist Black women into enlisted ranks, however Jacob's programme was not considered until James Forrestal became Secretary in 1944.

In 1944, Jacobs testified before the Committee on Naval Affairs of the House of Representatives, recommending that the Six-star rank of Admiral of the Navy be made the Naval equivalent to General of the Armies.

In 1945, Jacobs retired when he was succeeded at the Bureau of Naval Personnel by Rear-Admiral Louis E. Denfeld.

== Death ==
He died 19 June 1967 at Bethesda, Maryland. He is buried Section 30 at Arlington National Cemetery.

== Honours ==
He was a recipient of the Navy Distinguished Service Medal.
