= Capture of Giurgiu (1771) =

1771 siege during the Russo-Turkish war

- Part of the Russo-Turkish War (1768–1774)
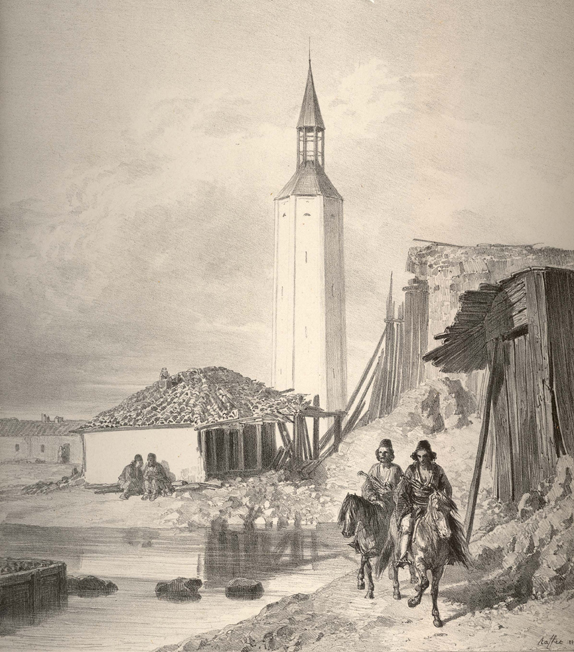
- The Giurgiu Clocktower built amidst the Russo-Turkish war
Date	27–29 May 1771
Location	Giurgiu, Ottoman Empire (Under Russian occupation) 43°54′N 25°58′E
Result	Ottoman victory
Territorial changes	Ottomans recapture Giurgiu

Belligerents
Ottoman Empire	Russian Empire

Commanders and leaders
(Ottoman Empire) Mehmed Pasha	Second-Major Genzel

Strength
14,000	600 to 707

Casualties and losses
Unknown	216 casualties
- Location within Europe Capture of Giurgiu (1771) (Romania)

The capture of Giurgiu (Note: Turkish: Yergöğü'nün ele geçirilmesi; Russian: Взятие Журжи; Romanian: Capturarea Giurgiului) was a military siege undertaken by the Ottomans between 27 and 29 May 1771 against the city of Giurgiu, occupied by the Russians since February. The siege was part of the Russo-Turkish War (1768–1774), and resulted in an Ottoman victory.

== Prelude ==
Pyotr Olitz marched onto Giurgiu with thousands of troops and captured it three months ago in a siege that lasted from 17 and 24 February 1771. Olitz left Second-Major Genzel in charge of the garrison and returned to Bucharest. The garrison of the fortress had 600 to 707 soldiers.

Aware that Giurgiu was inadequately garrisoned, Muhsinzade Mehmed Pasha ordered the build-up of soldiers in Rusçuk, which was very close to Giurgiu. On 25 and 26 May, the pasha landed his troops in the town of Slobozia and on an island opposite Giurgiu.

== Siege ==
On 20 February, a small Ottoman artillery unit was advanced to the outer walls of Giurgiu, where they started firing and thus commenced the siege. Instead of utilising the numerous fortress cannons to neutralise the Turkish battery, Genzel opted to launch a sortie with a small detachment of musketeers. However, this ended in failure, and the detachment from the fortress was pursued all the way to the drawbridge. 24 Russian soldiers were killed in this operation. The Turks, approaching the fortress almost at point-blank range, were shelled by the Russians and retreated after suffering losses.

Nikolai Repin set out from Bucharest to assist Genzel, assuming that he could defend Giurgiu for around two weeks. The garrison rejected 3 requests to surrender in an effort to obtain a favourable withdrawal. In the last letter Muhsinzade Mehmed Pasha asked Genzel "what do you want?". Genzel planned to reject even the pasha's question, but pressure from his officers forced him to change his mind. By 29 May, the garrison had lost 216 (mostly from diseases), and only 379 people remained. The Turkish artillery had also cut the chains that controlled the citadel's drawbridge, meaning the only barrier preventing the Turks from entering was the Russian canister shots directed across the lowered drawbridge. Genzel requested a delay of 8 days, but it was rejected and he was forced to surrender the fortress. The garrison left without any problems, taking all their properties and banners. Repnin arrived at the outskirts of Giurgiu only hours later, only to discover it was occupied by 14,000 Turks, prompting him to retreat back to Bucharest.

== Aftermath ==
After learning on 2 June that Genzel had surrendered Giurgiu, Pyotr Rumyantsev had Genzel, as well as officers Koliubakin and Ushakov, tried by a military court. Although they were sentenced to death by shooting, this was commuted and they were instead stripped of their military ranks. Their properties were also confiscated.

Giurgiu was attacked once again by the Russians under the command of Reinhold-Wilhelm von Essen on 7 August, which ended in failure. The final engagement in Giurgiu during the Russo-Turkish War (1768–1774) was a battle on 12 September 1771, which resulted in an Ottoman victory.
