= Generalissimo of the Soviet Union =

Military rank of the Soviet Union

Generalissimo of the Soviet Union Генералиссимус Советского Союза
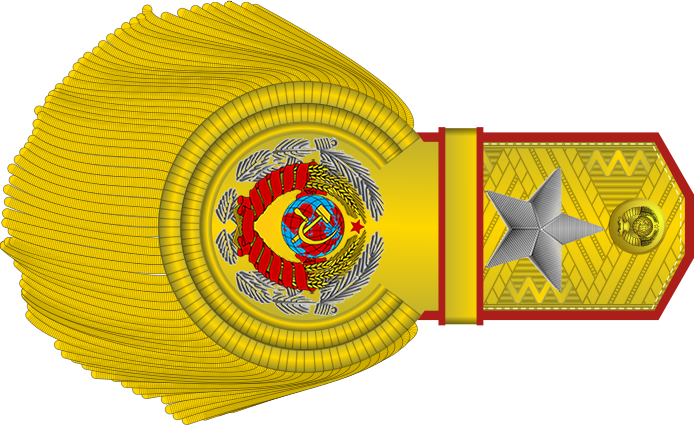
- Proposed epaulette
- Country: Soviet Union
- Service branch: Soviet Armed Forces
- Rank: General officer
- Formation: 26 June 1945
- Abolished: 1993
- Next lower rank: Marshal (Soviet Army); Admiral of the Fleet (Soviet Navy)

Generalissimo of the Soviet Union (Russian: Генералиссимус Советского Союза, romanized: Generalissimus Sovetskogo Soyuza) was the highest military rank in the Soviet Armed Forces. Created on 26 June 1945 following the victory over Nazi Germany in World War II, it was awarded to Premier Joseph Stalin the next day. Stalin, the only person to ever hold this rank, soon came to regret accepting the title, viewing it as overly ostentatious. He rejected the proposed opulent uniform and continued to wear the insignia and uniform of his pre-existing rank, Marshal. Though never awarded again, the rank officially remained in Soviet military statutes until 1993.

== History ==
The rank of Generalissimo was awarded to several military leaders in the Imperial Russian Army, including for the first time by Peter the Great to Aleksei Shein in 1696, by Catherine I to Prince Alexander Danilovich Menshikov in 1727, to Duke Anthony Ulrich of Brunswick in 1740, and most famously by Paul I to Count Alexander Suvorov amid the War of the Second Coalition in 1799.

The first proposal to create the rank of Generalissimo of the Soviet Union came after the Red Army's victory at the Battle of Stalingrad in World War II. On 6 February 1943, the Central Committee of the All-Union Communist Party (Bolsheviks) received an appeal from employees at a Moscow factory for Joseph Stalin, "a brilliant military leader", to be awarded the title of Generalissimo of the Red Army. Another such proposal was submitted to the party's Politburo on 24 June 1945, the day of the Victory Parade in Moscow's Red Square, by the commanders of the Red Army, Navy, and the General Staff. The note stated that "for the outstanding leadership of combat operations of the active Army and Navy, which led to the historic victory over Nazi Germany in the Great Patriotic War", it was necessary "to establish the military rank of Generalissimo of the Soviet Union and to award it to Comrade Stalin".

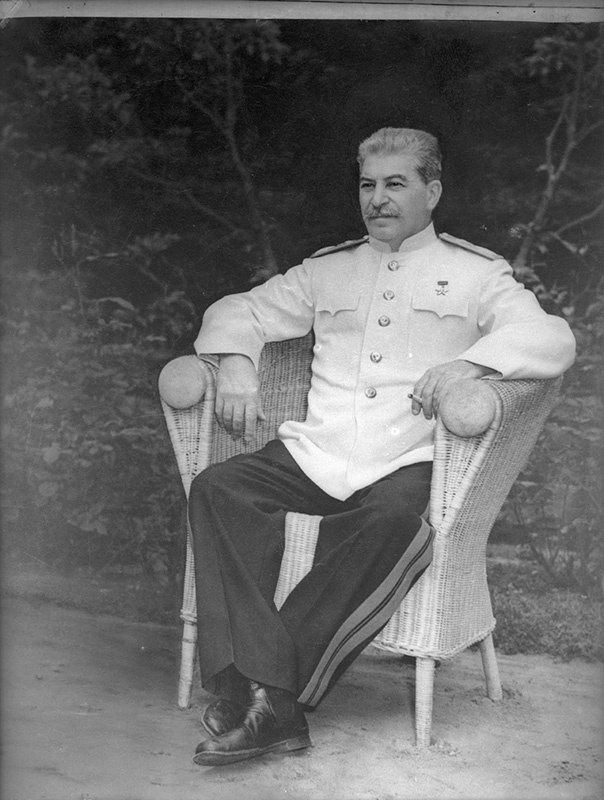
Joseph Stalin at the Potsdam Conference in 1945, wearing his Marshal uniform

The rank of Generalissimo was established by the Presidium of the Supreme Soviet on 26 June 1945, and awarded to Stalin (who had held the rank of Marshal since 1943) on 27 June by the same body "for especially outstanding services to the Motherland in leading all the armed forces of the state during the war". Stalin soon regretted allowing himself the title, and at the Potsdam Conference asked Winston Churchill to continue to refer to him as Marshal instead. Stalin rejected any distinction between his rank and Marshal, and continued to wear his Marshal insignia and uniform. According to the memoirs of General Sergei Shtemenko, in one episode General Andrey Khrulyov, the head of logistics for the Red Army, designed an "opulent" uniform for the rank "sewn on the model of Kutuzov's times", with a high standing collar and gilded stripes on the trousers. Upon presenting it to Stalin, the following was said:

Stalin: Who are you going to dress like this?
Khrulyov: This is the proposed uniform for the Generalissimo.
Stalin: For whom?
Khrulyov: For you, Comrade Stalin...

Stalin burst into a long and angry tirade against his excessive glorification, and the subject was not raised again. The rank of Generalissimo, while never awarded to another holder, continued to appear in the list of ranks and in statutes of the Soviet Armed Forces until 1993. In 1996, a replica of the proposed uniform was exhibited at the Museum of the Great Patriotic War in Moscow, and design sketches for it were published in 2001.

== Proposed insignia ==
Below are proposed designs of the shoulder insignia of Generalissimo of the Soviet Union.

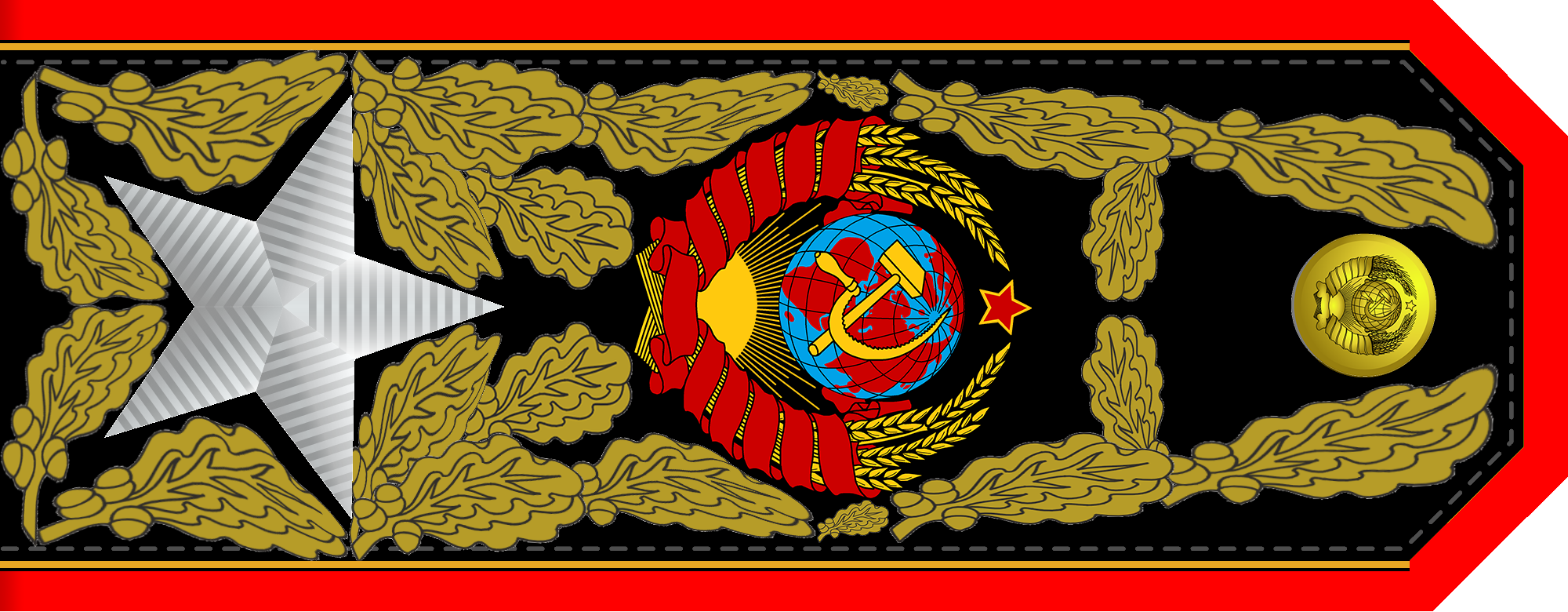

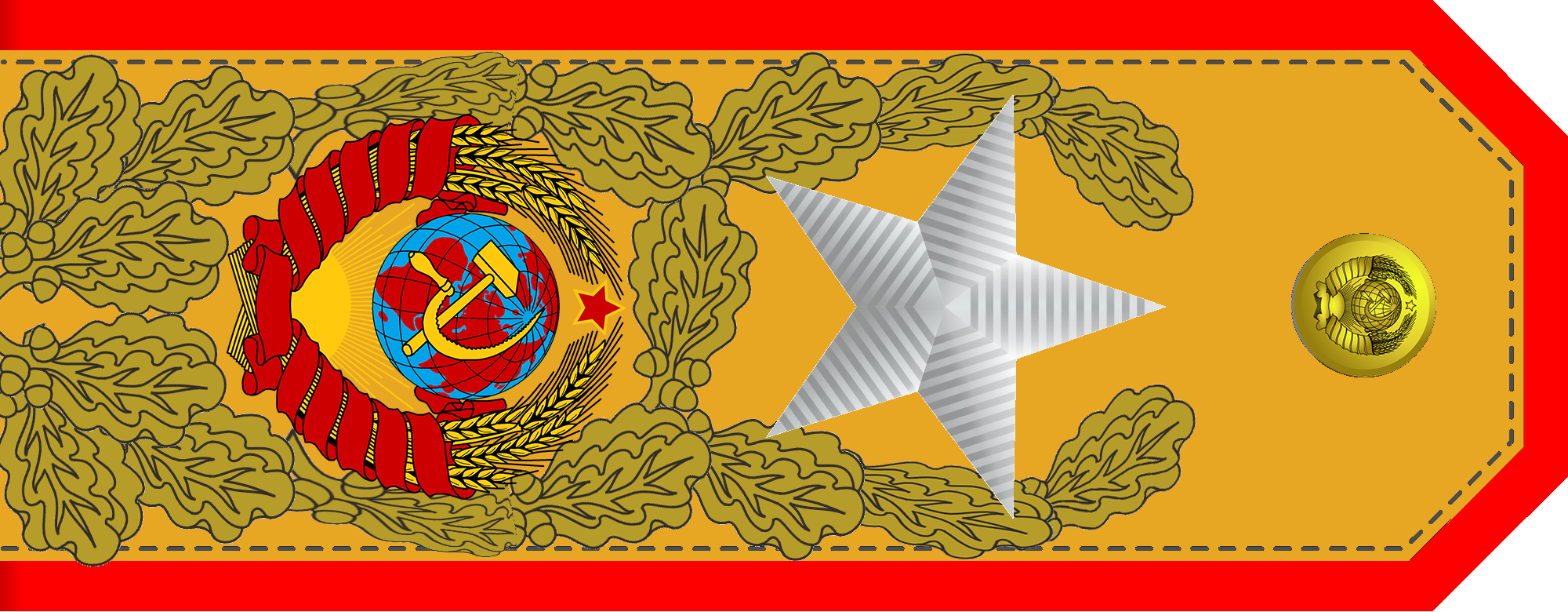

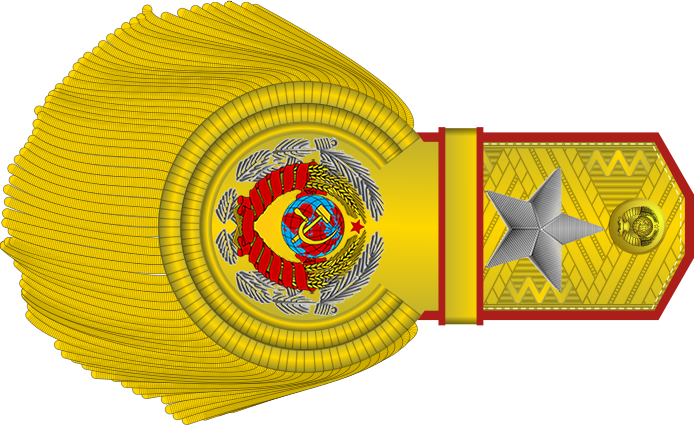

== See also ==
- Grand Marshal of the People's Republic of China
- List of Russian field marshals
