= Six-star rank =

Proposed U.S. military rank

Proposed insignia of a six-star rank

In the United States Armed Forces, a six-star rank is a proposed rank immediately superior to a five-star rank, possibly to be worn by the General of the Armies.

== History ==
When Congress approved a bill to create the rank of Fleet Admiral in 1944, the Navy wanted to re-establish and elevate Admiral of the Navy to be equivalent to General of the Armies, which requires an Act of Congress. Chief of Naval Personnel Vice Admiral Randall Jacobs testified before the Committee on Naval Affairs of the House of Representatives, recommending that the rank of Admiral of the Navy be made the Naval equivalent to General of the Armies, which a previous failed bill submitted on 25 February 1944 tried to do. Congress passed Pub.L. 78-482 on 14 December 1944, creating the rank of Fleet Admiral, without re-establishing the rank of Admiral of the Navy.

=== Post–World War II ===
As such, the rank of Admiral of the Navy continued to be inactive. By 1955, the Navy concluded that the rank was honorary. And while they held to the belief that it was equivalent to General of the Armies, the Navy amended its regulations to establish fleet admiral as its highest achievable rank, adhering to the standard set by the law.

On 21 January 1955, a draft resolution was proposed to the U.S. Senate to authorize President Dwight D. Eisenhower to appoint Douglas MacArthur, then a five-star General of the Army, to be elevated to the "six-star rank" of General of the Armies of the United States "in recognition of the great services to his country", with "such appointment to take effect as of the seventy-fifth anniversary of his birth, 26 January 1955." The proposal had little chance of passing and was never voted on. The rank of General of the Armies had previously been granted in 1919 to active-duty four-star General John J. Pershing. The markings used to identify Pershing's new ranking as higher than general was a bank of four gold (rather than silver) stars.

In 1976, as part of commemorations for the U.S. Bicentennial, George Washington was posthumously promoted to the rank of General of the Armies of the United States. Although the law did not actually specify the number of stars, some U.S. newspapers and members of Congress described this as a "six-star rank". His appointment had been to serve as "General and Commander in Chief of the Army of the United Colonies".

== Gallery ==
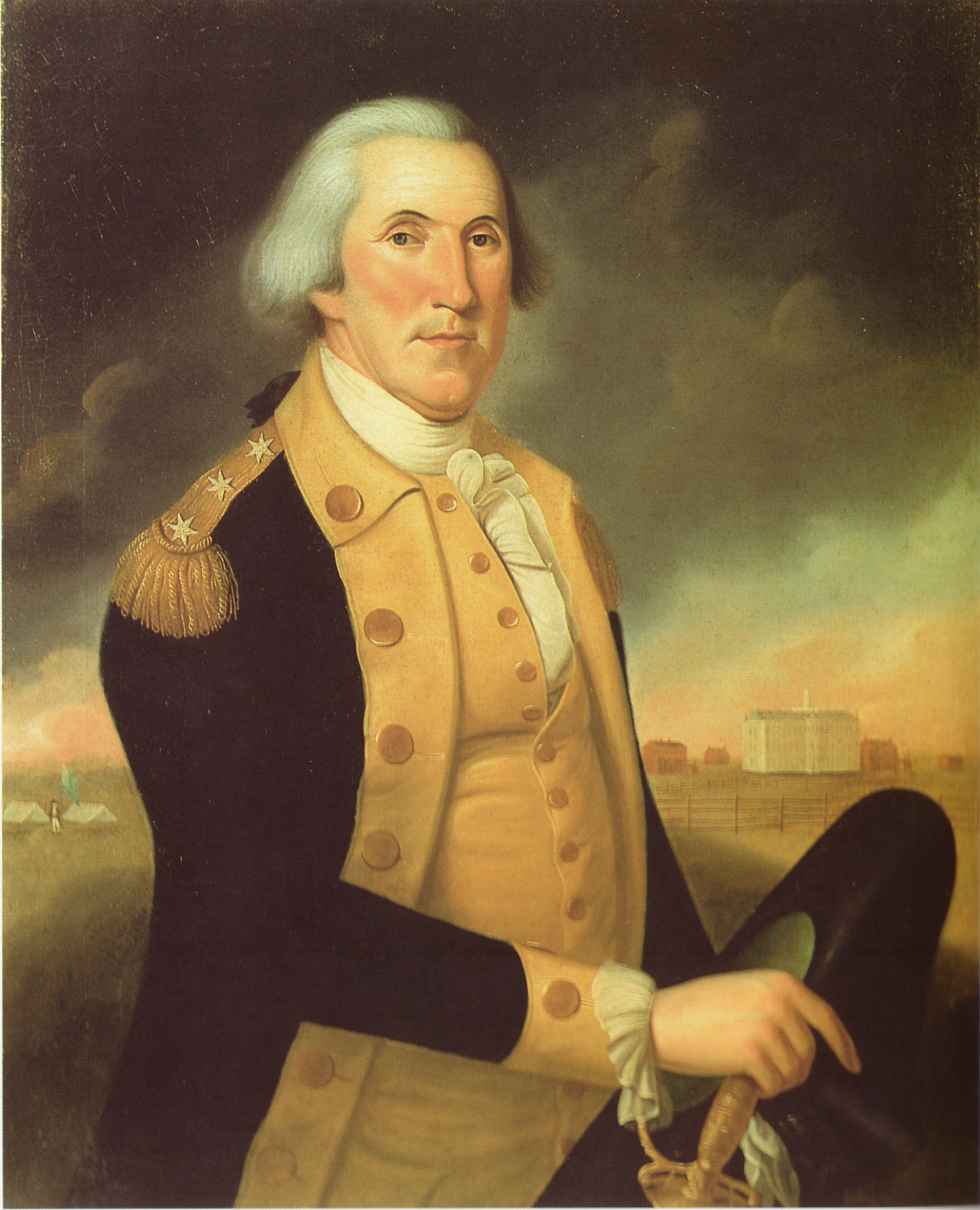
Painting of George Washington showing three star insignia. He was posthumously promoted to the rank of General of the Armies of the United States in 1976.

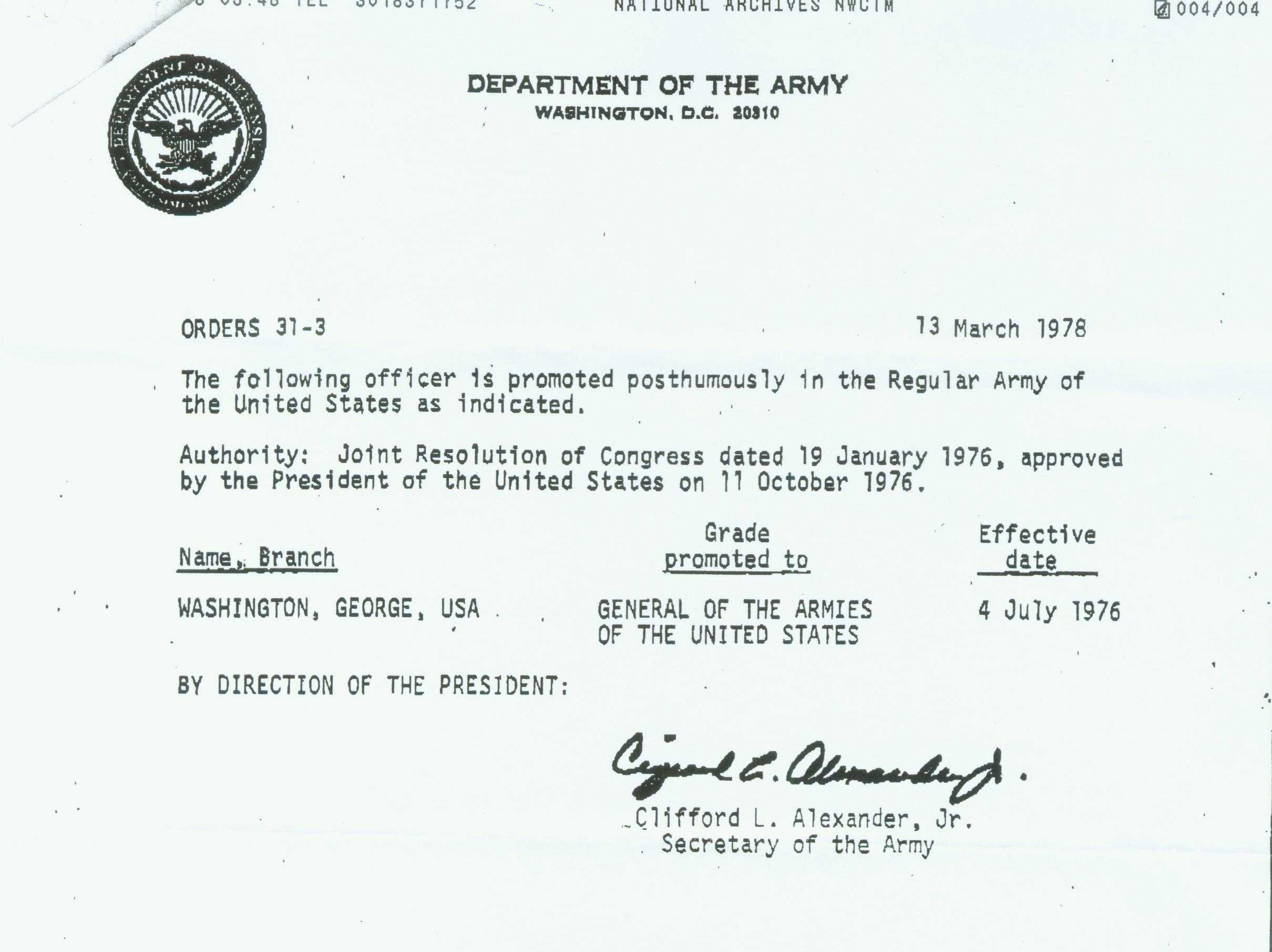
Order 31-3 for promoting George Washington to the rank of General of the Armies of the United States effective 4 July 1976

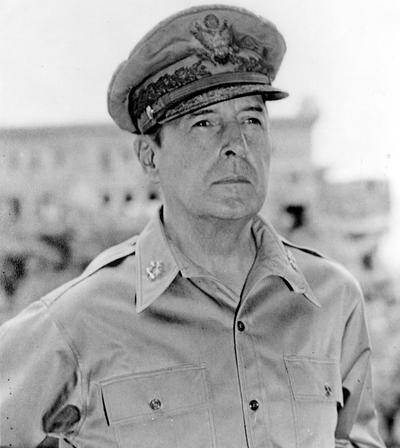
General Douglas MacArthur showing five-star rank insignia. A proposal in Congress (1955) that MacArthur be promoted to General of the Armies lapsed.

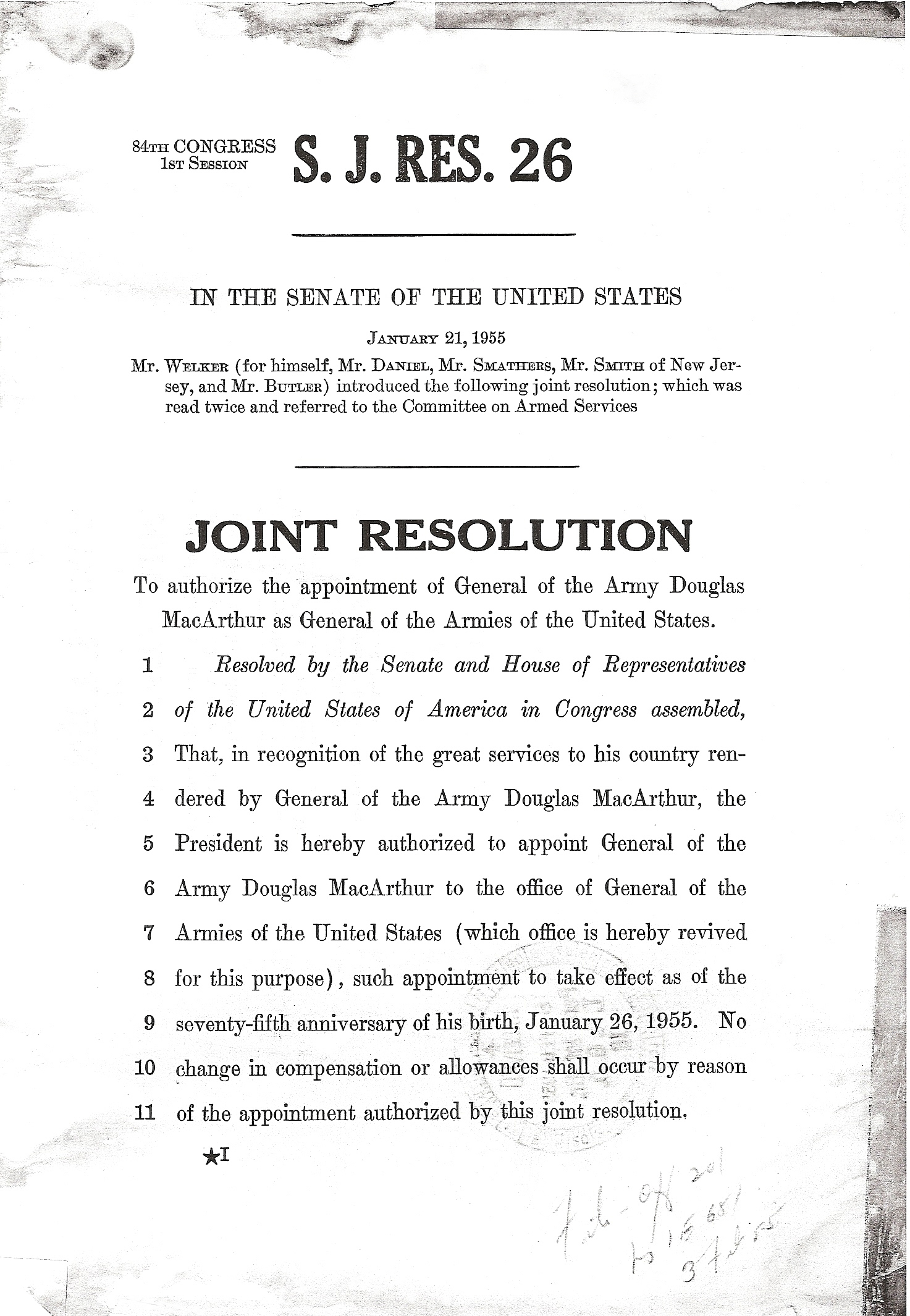
Proposed Congressional resolution authorizing promotion of Douglas MacArthur to General of the Armies. Copy taken from his service record on file at the National Personnel Records Center.

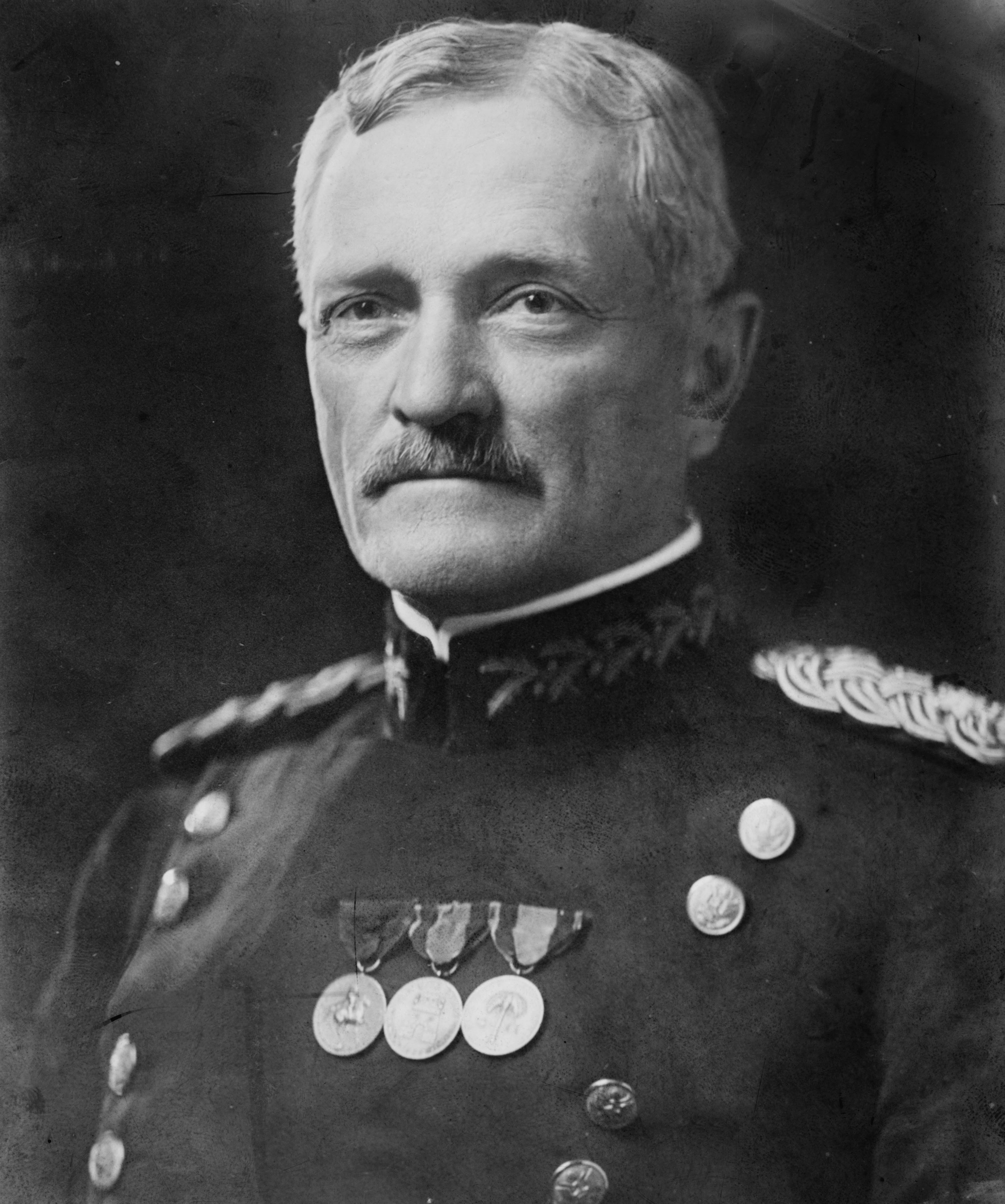
John Pershing held the rank General of the Armies during his lifetime, though he only wore four stars.

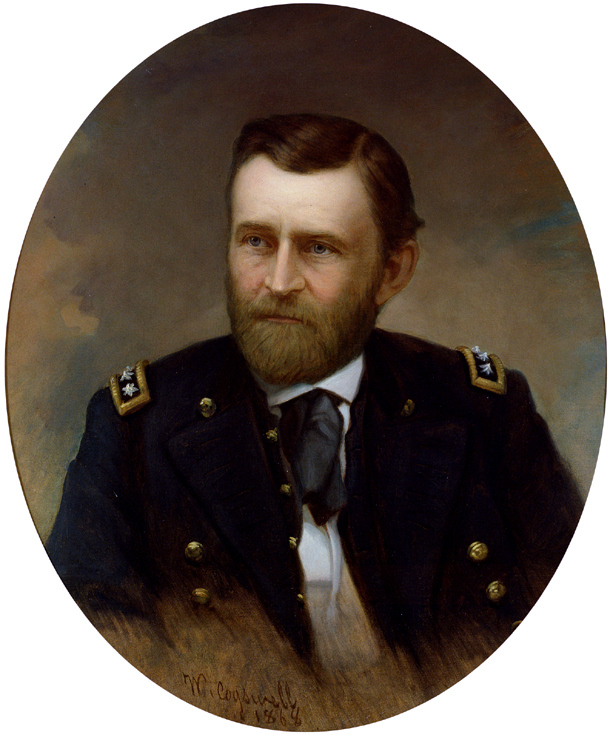
Ulysses S. Grant currently holds the rank General of the Armies on the retired list, though he never wore more than four stars.

== Other countries ==
The following military ranks can be considered analogous to General of the Armies:

- Dai-gensui (Empire of Japan)
- First Marshal of the Empire (Kingdom of Italy)
- Reichsmarschall (Nazi Germany)
- Taewonsu (North Korea)
- Dayuanshuai (People's Republic of China)
- Generalissimo of the Soviet Union (Soviet Union)
- Marshal of Yugoslavia (Socialist Federal Republic of Yugoslavia)

Other highest ranks are in the five-star rank category.

== See also ==
- Design of U.S. army insignia
- Heraldic origin of the use of five-pointed star
- Generalissimo
