= Generalissimo =

Military rank of the highest degree

Generalissimo (/ˌdʒɛn(ə)rəˈlɪsɪmoʊ/ JEN-(ə-)rə-LIS-ih-moh), also generalissimus, is a military rank of the highest degree, superior to field marshal and other five-star ranks in the states where they are used.

== Usage ==
The word generalissimo (pronounced [dʒeneraˈlissimo]), an Italian term, is the absolute superlative of generale ('general') thus meaning "the highest-ranking of all generals". The superlative suffix -issimo itself derives from Latin -issimus, meaning "utmost, to the highest grade". Similar cognates in other languages include generalísimo in Spanish, generalíssimo in Portuguese, généralissime in French, and generalissimus in Latin. The Russian word генералиссимус, generalissimus comes from Latin.

Historically, this rank was given to a military officer leading an entire army or the entire armed forces of a state, usually only subordinate to the sovereign. Alternatively, those of imperial blood or the commanders-in-chief of several allied armies could gain the title.

The military leader Albrecht von Wallenstein in 1632 became the first imperial generalissimo (general of the generals) of the Holy Roman Empire. Other usage of the title has been for the commander of the united armies of several allied powers (such as Ferdinand Foch on the Western Front in 1918 or Joseph Stalin on the Eastern Front in 1945), or if a senior military officer becomes a chief of state or a head of government (like Chiang Kai-shek in the Republic of China or Francisco Franco in Spain).

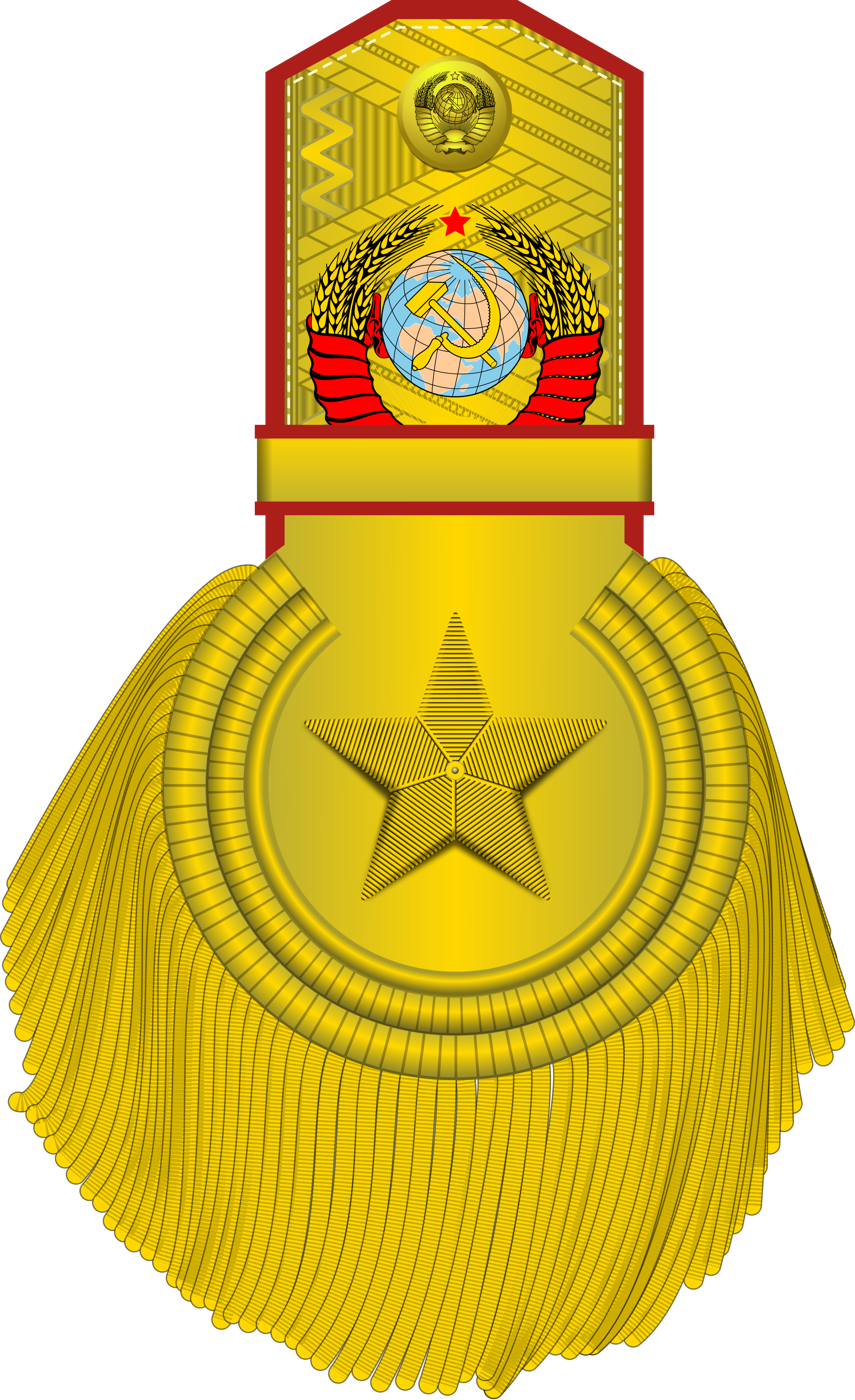
Proposed insignia of the Generalissimo of the Soviet Union (only held by Joseph Stalin)

The rank generalissimus of the Soviet Union would have been a generalissimo but some sources assert that Joseph Stalin refused to accept the rank. In fact the grade was established by the Presidium of the Supreme Soviet, which did not need the approval of Stalin. The rank of generalissimo for Stalin was used also by Western diplomacy.

In the 20th century, the term came to be associated with military officers who took dictatorial power in their respective countries, especially due to the Spanish leader Francisco Franco having this rank. As such, it is used in literature depicting fictional Latin American dictatorial regimes, for example Father Hilary's Holiday by Bruce Marshall.

== List of generalissimos ==
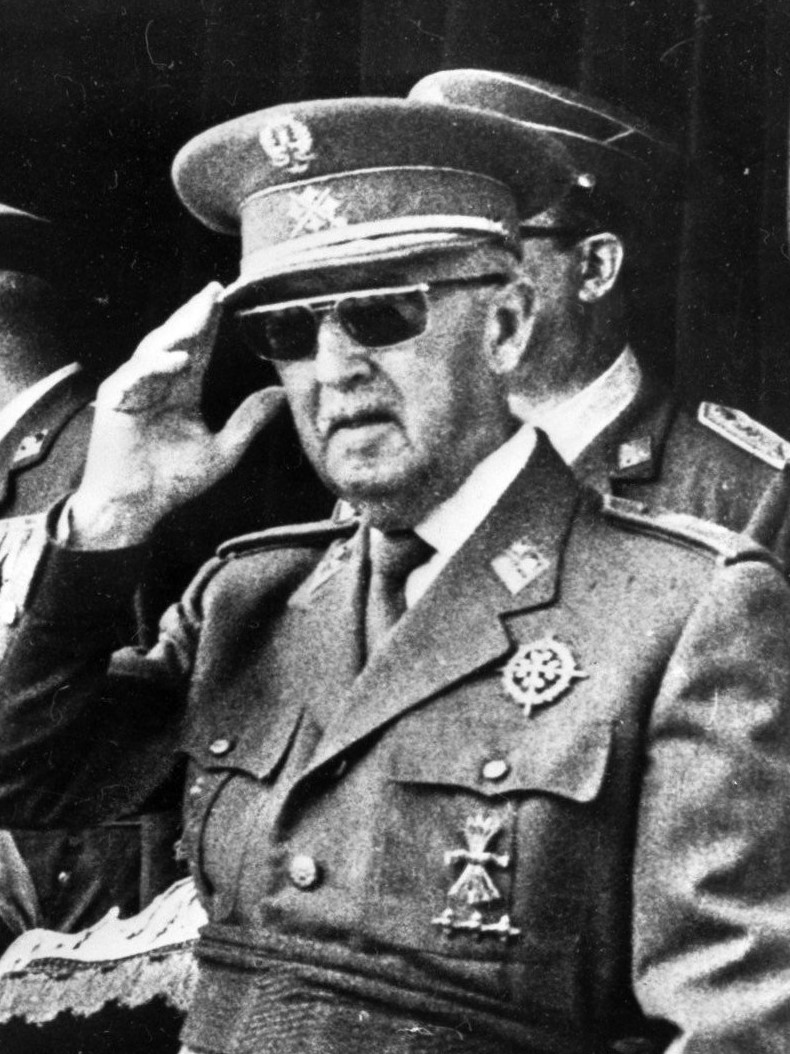
Francisco Franco, Generalissimo of Spain from 1936 to 1975

Person	Service	Country	Era	Notes
Prince Adolph John, Count Palatine of Kleeburg	The Deluge	Sweden	1655–1660	Named "Generalissimo of the Swedish armies in Poland and Prussia" by his brother King Charles X Gustav of Sweden
Emilio Aguinaldo	Philippine Revolutionary Army	Philippines	1898–1901	Generalissimo of the Katipunan
Crown Prince Charles John	Royal Swedish Army	Sweden	1810–1818	Named Generalissimo of the Swedish Armed Forces on October 20, 1810, upon his arrival to Sweden. Charles John had the singular distinction of having been offered the role of Generalissimo of four different nations: Sweden (accepted), Imperial Russia, offered by Alexander during the Conference at Åbo in 1812, of a restored Bourbon France in 1814 (offered by Louis XVIII's brother the Comte D'Artois), and a desperate offer by Napoleon in early 1814 as an inducement for Sweden to switch its alliance to France. Charles John declined the latter three. (Note: The Napoleonic Marshal of France Jean Baptiste Bernadotte, Prince of Ponte Corvo, was elected Crown Prince of Sweden by the Riksdag of the Estates and King Charles XIII in 1810. Given his exalted French military rank, the rank of generalissimus was likely granted him in order to give him precedence over "mere" Swedish field marshals. Once he became King of Sweden and Norway in 1818, the generalissimus rank became superfluous.)
Prince Charles Gustav	Thirty Years' War	Sweden	1648–1650	He was named "Generalissimo of all Swedish forces in Germany" by his cousin Queen Christina of Sweden in January 1648, however he didn't accomplish much as commander of the Swedish forces in Germany as the war ended in October of the same year.
Chiang Kai-shek	National Revolutionary Army	Republic of China	1926–1975	Appointed commander in chief of the Nationalist Army for the Northern Expedition. Appointed "general special class" (特級上將 Tèjí shàng jiàng) in 1935
John Churchill, 1st Duke of Marlborough	War of the Spanish Succession	Dutch Republic	1702	Referred to as generalissimo by the Dutch States General
Ferdinand Foch	French Army	France	1918	Généralissime was the title used to describe Marshal Ferdinand Foch's Allied Command, starting March 26, 1918. He actually held the rank of général de division, the dignity (rank) of Marshal of France and later the ranks of British field marshal and Marshal of Poland.
Deodoro da Fonseca	Brazilian Army	Brazil	1890	"Generalíssimo Comandante das Forças de Terra e Mar" (transl. Generalissimo Commander of the Forces of Land and Sea)
Francisco Franco	Spanish Armed Forces	Spain	1936–1975	Generalísimo was used as a combination rank as he held the highest possible rank in all three branches of service: capitán general, capitán general del Aire, and capitán general de la Armada.
Prince Consort Frederick of Hesse	Royal Swedish Army	Sweden	1716–1720	Fredrick was named "Generalissimo of the Swedish Armed forces to horse and foot" in 1716 by King Charles XII.
Maurice Gamelin	French Army	France	1939	His rank was général d'armée, but his title as commander-in-chief of the French Armed Forces was généralissime.
Prince George of Denmark	British Army	Great Britain	1702–1708	Declared "generalissimo of all our Forces within Our Kingdom of England and Ireland and Elsewhere" by his wife Queen Anne
Máximo Gómez	Cuban Liberation Army	Cuba	1895–1898	
Miguel Hidalgo y Costilla	Revolutionary Army of Mexico	Mexico	1810–1811	
Hirohito (Emperor Shōwa)	Armed Forces of the Empire of Japan	Japan	1926–1945	Dai-gensui, as sovereign ruler of the Empire of Japan
Agustín de Iturbide	Mexican Army	Mexico	1821–1823	
James, Duke of York	Third Anglo-Dutch War	England	1673	"Generalissimo and supreme commander" over forces employed against the Dutch.
Joseph Joffre	French Army	France	1914	His dignity (rank) was Marshal of France, but his title as commander-in-chief of the French Army was généralissime.
Kalākaua	Hawaiian Army	Hawaii	1886–1891	King of Hawaii, was given titles of "supreme commander and generalissimo of the Hawaiian Army".
Karl Philipp, Prince of Schwarzenberg	Austrian Army	Austrian Empire	1813–1814	Generalissimo of the Armies of the Habsburg Empire and senior Field Marshal of the combined forces of the Sixth Coalition. He led the largest Allied field army, the Army of Bohemia, during the Battle of Leipzig in 1813 and the Invasion of France in early 1814.
Kim Il Sung	Korean People's Army	North Korea	1992	Taewonsu
Kim Jong Il	Korean People's Army	North Korea	2012	Taewonsu (posthumously awarded)
Louis, Grand Dauphin	War of the Spanish Succession	France	1708	Commanded the French Army
Mao Zedong	People's Liberation Army	People's Republic of China	1955	Proposed the rank of Generalissimo of the People's Republic of China (declined usage)
Alexander Danilovich Menshikov	Imperial Russian Army	Russia	1727–1728	
Francisco de Miranda	Venezuelan Army	Venezuela	1812	
José María Morelos	Revolutionary Army of Mexico	Mexico	1813–1815	
Ihsan Nuri	Ararat Forces	Ararat	1927–1930	
Alexander Suvorov	Imperial Russian Army	Russia	1799	
Duke Anthony Ulrich of Brunswick	Imperial Russian Army	Russia	1740–1741	
Maxime Weygand	French Army	France	1940	His rank was général d'armée, but his title as commander-in-chief of the French Armed Forces was généralissime.
José de San Martín	Peruvian Army	Peru	1821–1822	Generalísimo de las Armas del Perú
Joseph Stalin	Soviet Armed Forces	Soviet Union	1945	Generalissimus of the Soviet Union (declined usage)
Sun Yat-sen	National Pacification Army	Republic of China	1921	Technically as dayuanshuai or "grand marshal of the army and navy"
Mahmud Shevket Pasha	Ottoman Armed Forces	Ottoman Empire	1909	Grand Vizier of the Ottoman Empire who was associated with the title by many observers
Rafael Trujillo	Dominican Army	Dominican Republic	1930	
Albrecht von Wallenstein	Thirty Years' War	Holy Roman Empire	1625	Via the "Principal Decree of the Imperial Deputation"
George Washington	Continental Army; United States Army	United States	1776	When chosen to be the commander-in-chief, was called by The Virginia Gazette the generalissimo of American forces. Promoted posthumously to General of the Armies of the United States on January 19, 1976, with date of rank of July 4, 1976
William, Count of Schaumburg-Lippe	Royal Portuguese Army	Portugal	1762–1763	Became Generalissimus of the Allied Armies in Portugal during the Spanish invasion
Yuan Shikai	Beiyang Army	Republic of China (1912–1949)	1913–1916	Leader of the Beiyang government, declared generalissimo (dayuanshuai) in 1913
Zhang Zuolin	National Pacification Army	Republic of China (1912–1949)	1927–1928	Leader of the Beiyang government, declared generalissimo (dayuanshuai) in June 1927
Alexandros Papagos	Hellenic Army	Kingdom of Greece	1926–1951	Leader of the Hellenic Army in World War II
Our Lady of Aparecida	Brazilian Army	Brazil	1967	Patroness of Brazil, uses the feminine equivalent title Generalissima.

== See also ==
- Admiralissimo
- Capo dei capi
- Caudillo
- Commander-in-chief
- Grand marshal
- Dayuanshuai
- Dai-gensui
- Field marshal
- First marshal of the empire
- General of the Armies
- Generalissimo of the Soviet Union
- Highest military ranks
- Magister Militum
- Marshal General of France
- Shogun
- Six-star rank
