= Storming of Giurgiu =

Russian assault on Giurgiu (Russo-Turkish war of 1768–74)

- Part of the Russo-Turkish War (1768–1774)
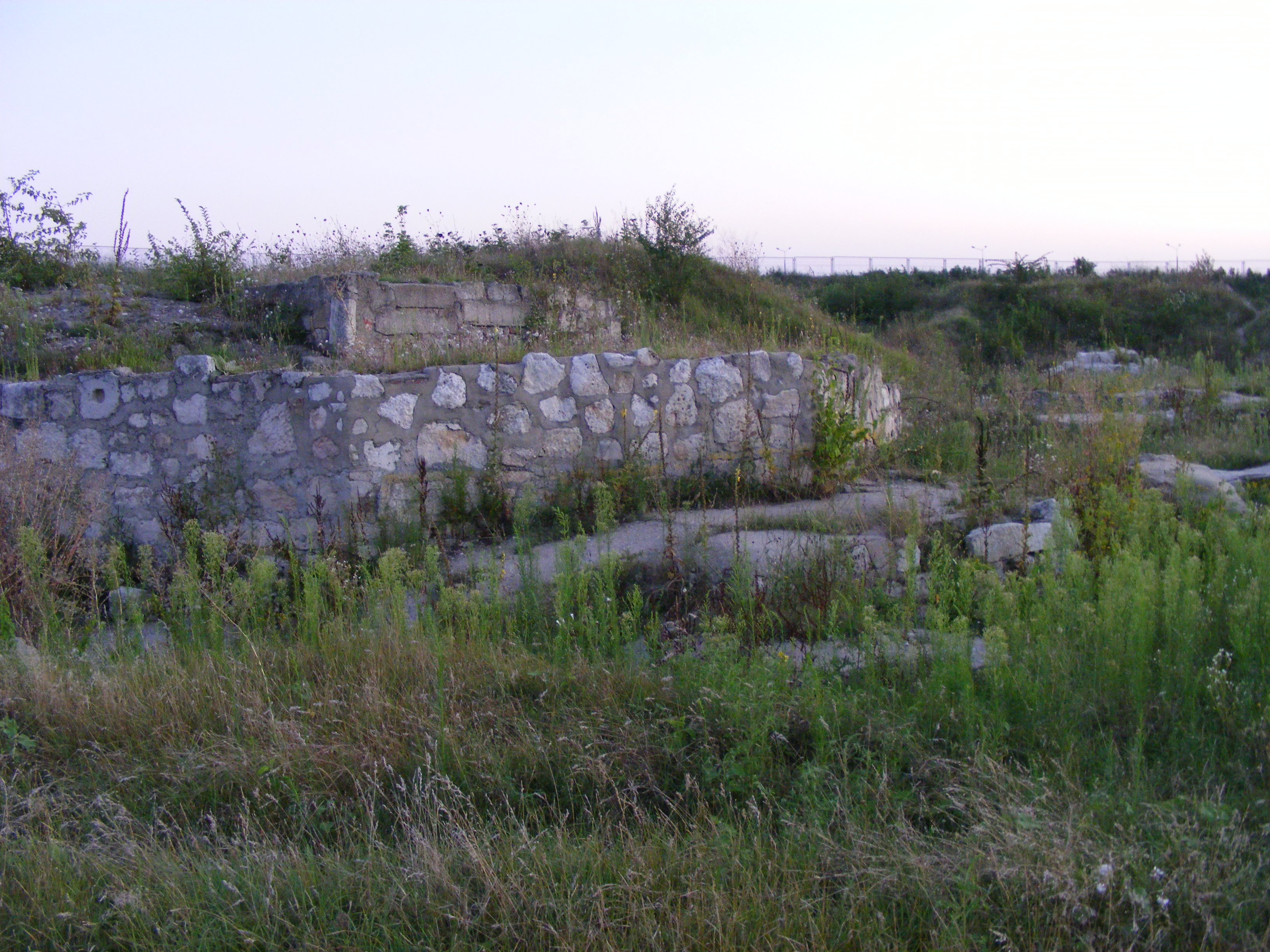
- Ruins of the fortifications of Giurgiu
Date	7 August 1771
Location	Giurgiu, Ottoman Empire (Now in Romania) 43°54′N 25°58′E
Result	Ottoman victory
Territorial changes	Russian forces repulsed from Giurgiu

Belligerents
Ottoman Empire	Russian Empire

Commanders and leaders
(Ottoman Empire) Mehmed Pasha	Reinhold-Wilhelm Ivanovich von Essen; Pyotr Czartoryski †; Ivan Gudovich (WIA); Olufiev (WIA)

Strength
7,000	6,000–10,000

Casualties and losses
Unknown	514 killed 1,795 wounded
- Location within Europe Storming of Giurgiu (Romania)

The Storming of Giurgiu was a military storm undertaken by the Russians on August 7, 1771, against the city of Giurgiu. The storm was part of the Russo-Turkish War (1768–1774), and resulted in an Ottoman victory.

== Storming ==
On August 7, General Essen commanded a Russian attack on the Ottoman fortress of Giurgiu during the Russo-Turkish War. Three assault columns led by Generals Czartoryski, Olsuf'ev, and Gudovich attempted to capture the fortress. The lack of adequate artillery support and an insufficient number of siege ladders hindered the assault.

The Russians were repelled by the fire of the Ottoman defenders and pikemen, who pushed the attackers into the moat. The commanders of all three assault columns, Czartoryski, Olsuf'ev, and Gudovich—were wounded, with General Czartoryski suffering fatal injuries. Russian forces sustained losses amounting to about one-third of their troops and were forced to retreat. The Turks did not pursue them.

== Aftermath ==
The last Battle of Giurgiu during the Russo-Turkish War (1768–1774) was a battle on 12 September 1771, which resulted in an Ottoman victory.
