= Zhou Enlai =

Premier of China from 1949 to 1976

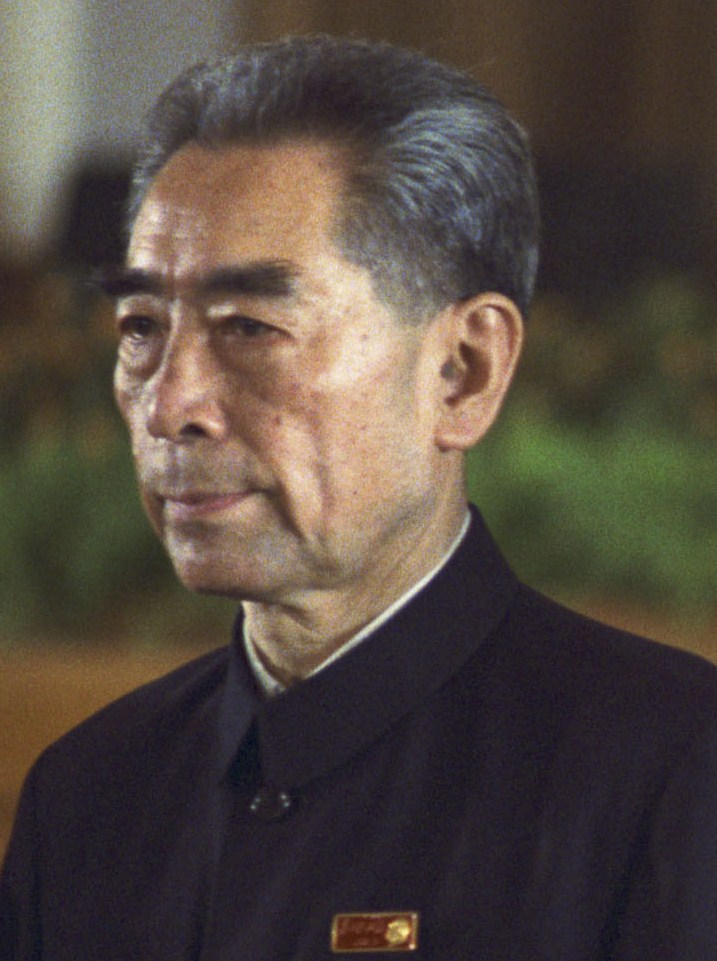
- Zhou in 1972

Premier of China
- In office 1 October 1949 – 8 January 1976
- Chairman: Mao Zedong
- First Vice Premier: Dong Biwu; Chen Yun; Lin Biao; Deng Xiaoping
- Preceded by: Position established (People's Republic of China); Yan Xishan (as Premier of the Republic of China)
- Succeeded by: Hua Guofeng

Minister of Foreign Affairs
- In office 1 October 1949 – 11 February 1958
- Premier: Himself
- Preceded by: Position established (People's Republic of China); Hu Shih (as Minister of Foreign Affairs of the Republic of China)
- Succeeded by: Chen Yi

Vice Chairman of the Chinese Communist Party
- In office 30 August 1973 – 8 January 1976
- In office 28 September 1956 – 1 August 1966
- Chairman: Mao Zedong

2nd Chairman of the National Committee of the Chinese People's Political Consultative Conference
- In office December 1954 – 8 January 1976
- Honorary Chairman: Mao Zedong
- Preceded by: Mao Zedong
- Succeeded by: Vacant (1976–1978); Deng Xiaoping

Personal details
- Born: 5 March 1898 Huai'an, Jiangsu, China
- Died: 8 January 1976 (aged 77) Beijing, China
- Party: Chinese Communist Party
- Other political affiliations: Kuomintang (1923–1927)
- Spouse: Deng Yingchao (m. 1925)
- Children: 2, including Sun Weishi (both adopted)
- Education: Nankai University
- Website: zhouenlai.people.cn

Military service
- Branch: National Revolutionary Army (1937–1945); Chinese Red Army; People's Liberation Army
- Rank: Lieutenant General of the National Revolutionary Army
- Conflicts: Northern Expeditions; Nanchang Uprising; Encirclement Campaigns; Second Sino-Japanese War; Chinese Civil War
- Zhou's voice Zhou during an interview with CBS; Recorded 1965

Chinese name
- Simplified Chinese: 周恩来
- Traditional Chinese: 周恩來
Transcriptions
Standard Mandarin
- Hanyu Pinyin: Zhōu Ēnlái
- Bopomofo: ㄓㄡ ㄣ ㄌㄞˊ
- Gwoyeu Romatzyh: Jou Enlai
- Wade–Giles: Chou^{1} Ên^{1}-lai^{2}
- IPA: [ʈʂóʊ ə́nlǎɪ]
Wu
- Suzhounese: Tseu^{1} En^{1}-le^{2}
Yue: Cantonese
- Yale Romanization: Jāu Yān-lòih
- Jyutping: Zau^{1} Jan^{1}-loi^{4}
- IPA: [tsɐw˥ jɐn˥ lɔj˩]

Courtesy name
- Chinese: 翔宇
Transcriptions
Standard Mandarin
- Hanyu Pinyin: Xiángyǔ
- Wade–Giles: Hsiang^{2}-yü^{3}
Yue: Cantonese
- Jyutping: Coeng^{4}-jyu^{5}

Zhou Enlai (Chinese: 周恩来; pinyin: Zhōu Ēnlái; Wade–Giles: Chou^{¹} Ên^{¹}-lai^{²}; 5 March 1898 – 8 January 1976) was a Chinese statesman, diplomat, and revolutionary who served as the first Premier of the People's Republic of China from October 1949 until his death in January 1976. Zhou was among the Chinese Communist Party's earliest leaders, though he was subordinate to Mao Zedong following the Zunyi Conference. After the founding of the PRC, he helped Mao consolidate party power and shape foreign policy, while striving to maintain state operations amid tumultuous politics.

As a diplomat, Zhou served as the PRC's foreign minister from 1949 to 1958. Advocating peaceful coexistence with the West after the Korean War, he attended the 1954 Geneva Conference and the 1955 Bandung Conference, helped orchestrate Richard Nixon's 1972 visit to China, and steered China's relations with major countries including the United States and the Soviet Union.

As premier, Zhou was the main force maintaining the Chinese government and economy during the Cultural Revolution. He remained deferential to Mao, but attempted to mitigate the damage and to shield some from purges and persecution. Deng Xiaoping maintained that without Zhou, the Cultural Revolution might have been worse, but might not have dragged on for as long. Following the fall of Lin Biao, Zhou was elected the first-ranking Vice Chairman of the Communist Party by the 10th Central Committee in 1973, while contending with the Gang of Four. After the 4th National People's Congress on 13 January 1975, he withdrew from public life for medical treatment and died the following year. The outpouring of grief turned into the 1976 Tiananmen Incident and signaled the beginning of the end for the Cultural Revolution. After his death, his widow, Deng Yingchao, became instrumental in the post-Mao reform and opening up, as one of the Eight Elders.

== Early life ==
=== Youth ===
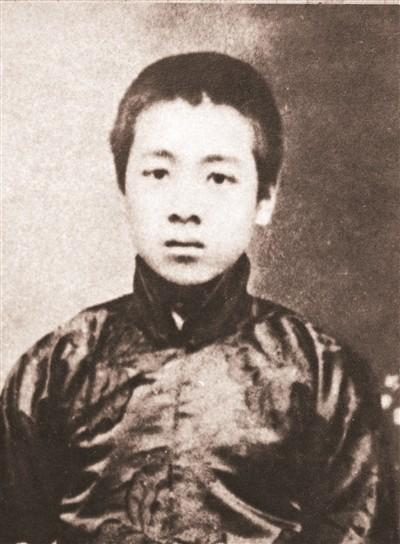
Zhou Enlai (1912)

Zhou Enlai was born in Huai'an, Jiangsu province, on 5 March 1898, the first son of his branch of the Zhou family. The Zhou family was originally started by an official of Shaoxing in Zhejiang province while Zhou Enlai's Gan Jiangxi mother was from Nanchang city. During the late Qing dynasty, Shaoxing was famous as the home of families such as Zhou's, whose members worked as government "clerks" (師爺, shiye) generation after generation. To move up the ladder in civil service, the men in these families often had to be transferred, and in the late years of the Qing dynasty, Zhou Enlai's branch of the family moved to Huai'an. Even after the move, however, the family continued to view Shaoxing as its ancestral home.

Zhou's grandfather, Zhou Panlong, and his granduncle, Zhou Jun'ang, were the first members of the family to move to Huai'an. Panlong apparently passed the provincial examinations, and Zhou Enlai later claimed that Panlong served as magistrate governing Huai'an county. Zhou's father, Zhou Yineng, was the second of Zhou Panlong's four sons. Zhou's birth mother, surnamed Wan, was the daughter of a prominent official of Jiangxi origin. (Note: During the Cultural Revolution, when "red" (poor) family background became essential for everything from college admission to government service, Zhou had to go back to his mother's mother whom he claimed was a farmer's daughter, to find a family member who qualified as "red".)

Like many others, the economic fortunes of Zhou's large family of scholar-officials were decimated by a great economic recession that China suffered in the late 19th century. Zhou Yineng had a reputation for honesty, gentleness, intelligence, and concern for others, but was also considered "weak" and "lacking in discipline and determination". He was unsuccessful in his personal life, and drifted across China doing various occupations, working in Beijing, Shandong, Anhui, Shenyang, Inner Mongolia, and Sichuan. Zhou Enlai later remembered his father as being always away from home and generally unable to support his family.

Soon after birth, Zhou Enlai was adopted by his father's youngest brother, Zhou Yigan, who was ill with tuberculosis. Apparently, the adoption was arranged because the family feared Yigan would die without an heir. (Note: This is the reason for the adoption given in Gao (23). Lee (11) suggests that it was due to the belief that having a son could cure a father's illness.) Zhou Yigan died soon after the adoption, and Zhou Enlai was raised by Yigan's widow, whose surname was Chen. Madame Chen was also from a scholarly family and received a traditional literary education. According to Zhou's own account, he was very close to his adoptive mother and acquired his lasting interest in Chinese literature and opera from her. Madame Chen taught Zhou to read and write at an early age, and Zhou later claimed to have read the famous vernacular novel Journey to the West at the age of six. By the age of eight, he was reading other traditional Chinese novels, including the Water Margin, Romance of the Three Kingdoms, and Dream of the Red Chamber.

Zhou's birth mother Wan died in 1907 when Zhou was 9, and his adoptive mother Chen in 1908 when Zhou was 10. Zhou's father was working in Hubei, far from Jiangsu, so Zhou and his two younger brothers returned to Huai'an and lived with his father's remaining younger brother Yikui for the next two years. In 1910, Zhou's uncle Yigeng, his father's older brother, offered to care for Zhou. The family in Huai'an agreed, and Zhou was sent to stay with his uncle in Manchuria at Fengtian (now Shenyang), where Zhou Yigeng worked in a government office. (Note: Zhou's father may have also been in Manchuria at this time, and Zhou may have lived with him for a while. Afterward Zhou's contacts with his father diminished. He died in 1941. See Lee 19–21 for a discussion of Zhou's relationship with his father.)

=== Education ===
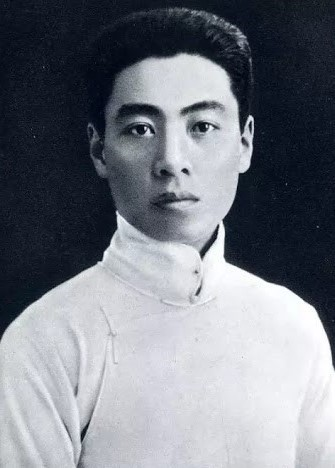
Zhou Enlai as a student in Nankai Middle School

In Fengtian, Zhou attended the Dongguan Model Academy, a modern-style school. His previous education consisted entirely of homeschooling. In addition to new subjects such as English and science, Zhou was also exposed to the writings of reformers and radicals such as Liang Qichao, Kang Youwei, Chen Tianhua, Zou Rong, and Zhang Binglin. At the age of fourteen, Zhou declared that his motivation for pursuing education was to "become a great man who will take up the heavy responsibilities of the country in the future." In 1913, Zhou's uncle was transferred to Tianjin, where Zhou entered the famous Nankai Middle School.

Nankai Middle School was founded by Yan Xiu, a prominent scholar and philanthropist, and headed by Zhang Boling, one of the most important Chinese educators of the 20th century. Nankai's teaching methods were unusual by contemporary Chinese standards. By the time Zhou began attending, it had adopted the educational model used at the Phillips Academy in the United States. The school's reputation, with its "highly disciplined" daily routine and "strict moral code", attracted many students who later became prominent in public life. Zhou's friends and classmates there ranged from Ma Jun (an early communist leader executed in 1927) to K. C. Wu (later mayor of Shanghai and governor of Taiwan under the Nationalist party). Zhou's talents also attracted the attention of Yan Xiu and Zhang Boling. Yan in particular thought highly of Zhou, helping to pay for his studies in Japan and later France.

Yan was so impressed with Zhou that he encouraged Zhou to marry his daughter, but Zhou declined. Zhou later expressed the reasons for his decision not to marry Yan's daughter to his classmate, Zhang Honghao. Zhou said that he declined the marriage because he feared that his financial prospects would not be promising, and that Yan would, as his father-in-law, later dominate his life.

Zhou did well in his studies at Nankai; he excelled in Chinese, won several awards in the school speech club, and became editor of the school newspaper in his final year. Zhou was also very active in acting and producing dramas and plays at Nankai; many students who were not otherwise acquainted with him knew of him through his acting. Nankai preserves a number of essays and articles written by Zhou at this time, and these reflect the discipline, training, and concern for country that Nankai's founders attempted to instill in their students. At the school's tenth commencement in June 1917, Zhou was one of five graduating students honored at the ceremony, and one of the two valedictorians.

By the time that he graduated from Nankai, Zhang Boling's teachings of gong (public spirit) and neng (ability) had made a great impression on him. His participation in debates and stage performances contributed to his eloquence and skills of persuasion. Zhou left Nankai with a great desire to pursue public service, and to acquire the skills required to do so.

==== Life in Japan ====
Following many of his classmates, Zhou went to Japan in July 1917 for further studies. During his two years in Japan, Zhou spent most of his time in the East Asian Higher Preparatory School, a language school for Chinese students. Zhou's studies were supported by his uncles, and apparently Nankai founder Yan Xiu as well, but their funds were limited; during this period, Japan suffered from severe inflation. Zhou originally planned to win one of the scholarships offered by the Chinese government; these scholarships, however, required Chinese students to pass entrance examinations in Japanese universities. Zhou took entrance examinations for at least two schools but failed to gain admission; although not unexpected, given his struggles with the local language, these failures disappointed him deeply. Zhou's reported anxieties were compounded by the death of his uncle, Zhou Yikui, his inability to master Japanese, and the acute Japanese cultural chauvinism that discriminated against Chinese. By the time that Zhou returned to China in the spring of 1919, he had become deeply disenchanted with Japanese culture, rejecting the idea that the Japanese political model was relevant to China and disdaining the values of elitism and militarism that he observed. In his diary, he wrote:

In my opinion, militarism in the 20th century absolutely should not continuously be in existence. In the past, I had thought that it was militarism and elitism that might save China. Now I have realized that this is completely wrong!

Zhou's diaries and letters from his time in Tokyo show an interest in current global politics and events: the Russian Revolution of 1917 and the Bolsheviks' new policies answered his quest for radical and novel ideas. He was also invested in local Japanese issues, such as the rice riots that took place in 1918. He avidly read Chen Duxiu's progressive and left-leaning magazine, New Youth. as well as early Japanese works on Marx, and it has been claimed that he even attended Kawakami Hajime's lectures at Kyoto University (although this is now considered unlikely). Kawakami was an important figure in the early history of Japanese Marxism, and his translations and articles influenced a generation of Chinese communists. Among the texts he read during that time were Kawakami's Tale of Poverty, Kōtoku Shūsui's Quintessence of Socialism, and American journalist John Reed's account of the October revolution, Ten Days That Shook the World. Zhou's diaries also show his interest in Chinese student protests in opposition to the Sino-Japanese Joint Defense Agreement in May 1918, though he did not actively participate in them or head back to China as part of the "Returning Home Movement". His active role in political movements only began following his return to China, which finally took place when, in March 1918, he discovered that Nankai University was set to open in Tianjin that year. Before his departure, he visited Arashiyama in Kyoto along with other former Nankai students.

=== Early political activities ===
==== During the May Fourth movement ====
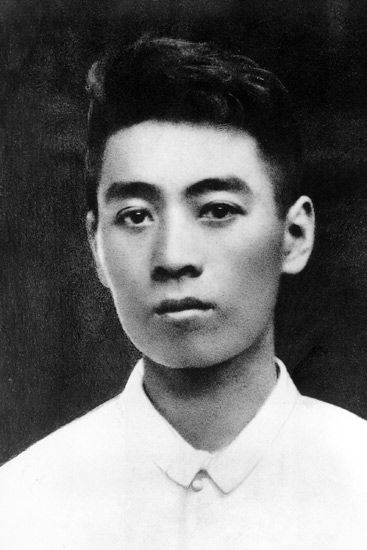
A young Zhou Enlai (1919)

Zhou returned to Tianjin in late April 1919. Historians disagree over his participation in the May Fourth Movement (May to June 1919). Zhou's "official" Chinese biography states that he was a leader of the Tianjin student protests in the May Fourth movement, but many modern scholars believe that it is highly unlikely that Zhou participated at all, based on the total lack of direct evidence among the surviving records from the period, and because he was most likely unaware that the movement was even taking shape prior to his return. However, like many others, he felt hopeful that the ongoing Paris Peace Conference would help China reclaim some of its lost privileges, as the country had been an Entente associate member under the Beiyang government. In this atmosphere, inspiration even came from US president Woodrow Wilson's ideas of democracy and national self-determination, which Chinese radicals interpreted in this context to support their discontent toward Japan's expansionism.

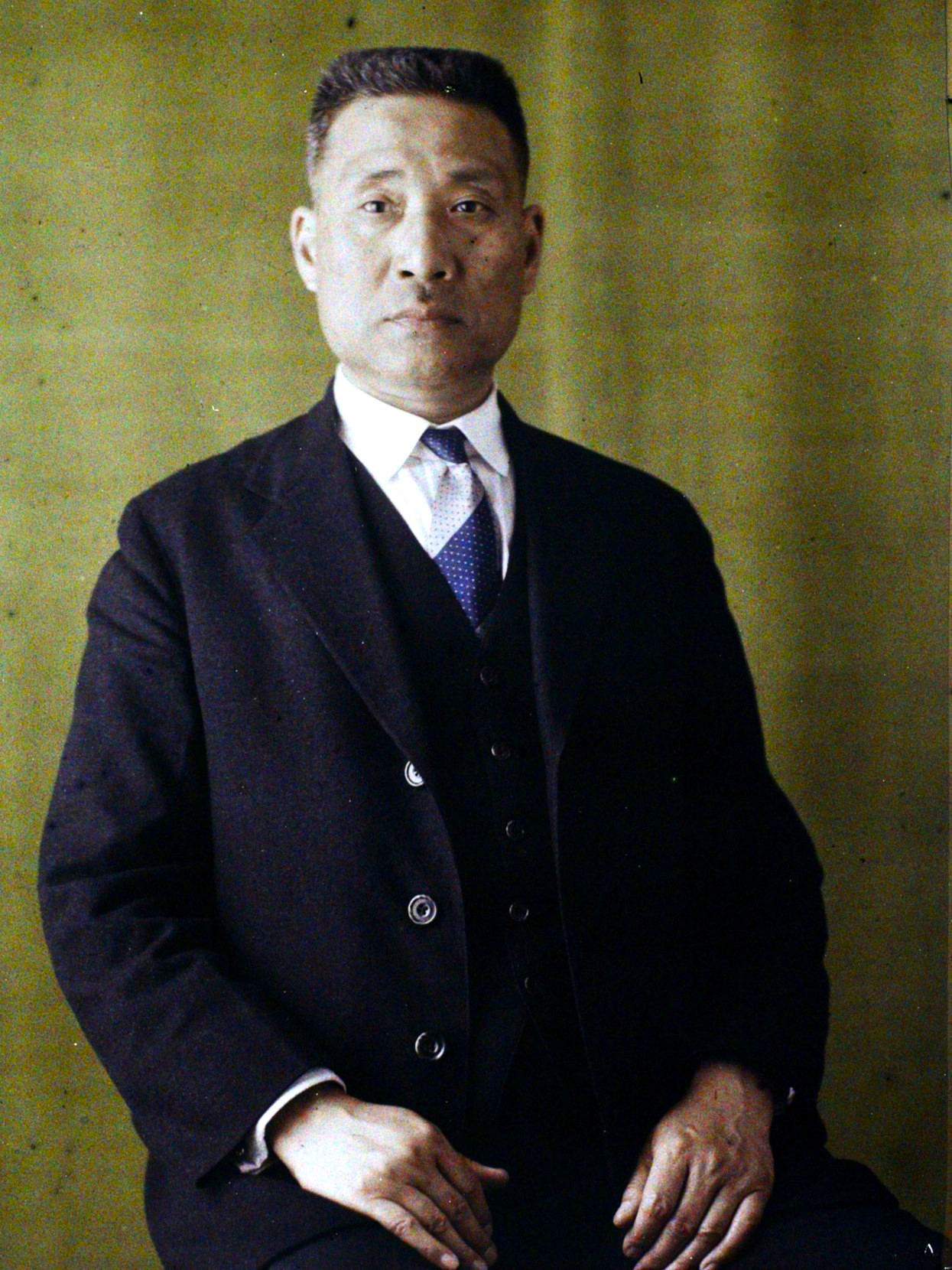
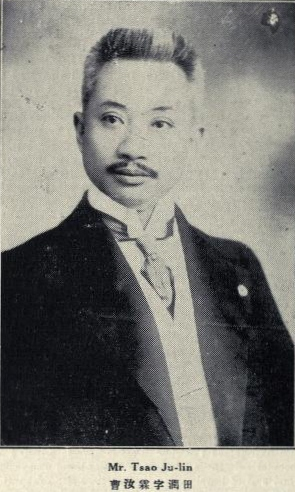
Chang Po-ling and Cao Rulin

Following the Chinese delegation's failure to secure China's interests in Paris, and Cao Rulin's subsequent retreat to his residence in one of the foreign concessions in Tianjin, the Japan-favoring Minister of Communications (who became known as one of the "three traitors", 三個賣國賊) offered a face-saving donation to Nankai, which was based in the city. Chang Po-ling, the highly respected founder of the institution, accepted this donation, which Zhou harshly criticized:

About Nankai... if the situation is examined from all angles, I must frankly say that it looks very dangerous. The principal may have had his own reasons, but I cannot understand what has been in his mind.

In July 1919, Zhou became editor of the Tianjin Student Union Bulletin, apparently at the request of his Nankai classmate, Ma Jun, a founder of the Union. During its brief existence from July 1919 to early 1920, the Bulletin was widely read by student groups around the country and suppressed on at least one occasion by the national government as "harmful to public safety and social order."

When Nankai University was established in August 1919, Zhou was in the first class, but was an activist full-time. His political activities continued to expand, and in September, he and several other students agreed to establish the "Awakening Society", a small group, never numbering more than 25. In explaining the goals and purpose of the Awakening Society, Zhou declared that "anything that is incompatible with progress in current times, such as militarism, the bourgeoisie, partylords, bureaucrats, inequality between men and women, obstinate ideas, obsolete morals, old ethics, ... should be abolished or reformed", and affirmed that it was the purpose of the Society to spread this awareness among the Chinese people. It was in this society that Zhou first met his future wife, Deng Yingchao. In some ways, the Awakening Society resembled the clandestine Marxist study group at Peking University headed by Li Dazhao, with the group members using numbers instead of names for "secrecy". (Zhou was "Number Five", a pseudonym which he continued to use in later years.) Indeed, immediately after the group was established, it invited Li Dazhao to give a lecture on Marxism.

Zhou assumed a more prominent active role in political activities over the next few months. The largest of these activities were rallies in support of a nationwide boycott of Japanese goods. As the boycott became more effective, the national government, under pressure from Japan, attempted to suppress it. On 23 January 1920, a confrontation over boycott activities in Tianjin led to the arrest of a number of people, including several Awakening Society members, and on 29 January Zhou led a march on the Governor's Office in Tianjin to present a petition calling for the arrestees' release. Zhou and three other leaders were themselves arrested. The arrestees were held for over six months; during their detention, Zhou supposedly organized discussions on Marxism. At their trial in July, Zhou, and six others were sentenced to two months; the rest were found not guilty. All were immediately released since they had already been held over six months.

After Zhou's release, he and the Awakening Society met with several Beijing organizations and agreed to form a "Reform Federation"; during these activities Zhou became more familiar with Li Dazhao and met Zhang Shenfu, who was the contact between Li in Beijing and Chen Duxiu in Shanghai. Both men were organizing underground Communist cells in cooperation with Grigori Voitinsky, a Comintern agent, but Zhou apparently did not meet Voitinsky at this point.

Soon after his release, Zhou decided to go to Europe to study. (He was expelled from Nankai University during his detention.) Although money was a problem, he received a scholarship from Yan Xiu. In order to gain greater funding, he successfully approached a Tianjin newspaper, Yishi bao (literally, Current Events Newspaper), for work as a "special correspondent" in Europe. Zhou left Shanghai for Europe on 7 November 1920 with a group of 196 work study students, including friends from Nankai and Tianjin.

Zhou's experiences after the May Fourth incident seem to have been crucial to his Communist career. Zhou's friends in the Awakening Society were similarly affected. 15 of the group's members became Communists for at least some time, and the group remained close later on. Zhou and six other group members traveled to Europe in the next two years, and Zhou eventually married Deng Yingchao, the group's youngest member.

=== European activities ===
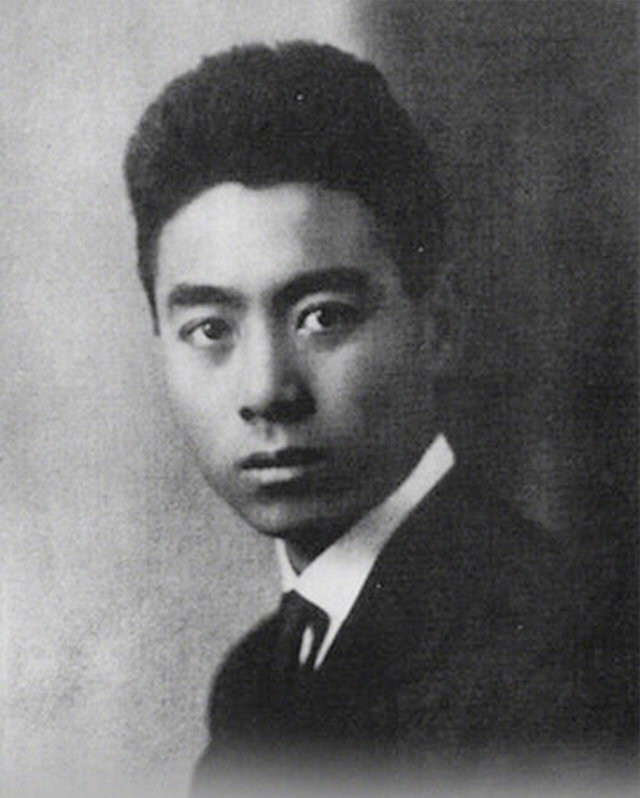
Zhou during his time in France (1920s)

Zhou's group arrived in Marseille on 13 December 1920. Unlike most other Chinese students, who went to Europe on work-study programs, Zhou's scholarship and position with Yishi bao meant that he was well provided for and did not have to do any work during his stay. His financial position let him devote himself full-time to revolutionary activities. In a letter to his cousin on 30 January 1921, Zhou said that his goals in Europe were to survey the social conditions in foreign countries and their methods of resolving social issues, in order to apply such lessons in China after his return. In the same letter, Zhou told his cousin that, regarding his adoption of a specific ideology, "I still have to make up my mind."

While in Europe, Zhou, also named as John Knight, studied the differing approaches to resolving class conflict adopted by various European nations. In London in January 1921, Zhou witnessed a large miners' strike and wrote a series of articles for the Yishi bao (generally sympathetic to the miners) examining the conflict between workers and employers, and the conflict's resolution. After five weeks in London he moved to Paris, where interest in Russia's 1917 October Revolution was high. In a letter to his cousin, Zhou identified two broad paths of reform for China: "gradual reform" (as in England) or "violent means" (as in Russia). Zhou wrote that "I do not have a preference for either the Russian or the British way... I would prefer something in-between, rather than one of these two extremes".

Still interested in academic programs, Zhou traveled to Britain in January 1921 to visit Edinburgh University. Concerned by financial problems and language requirements, he did not enroll, returning to France at the end of January. There are no records of Zhou entering any academic program in France. In spring 1921, he joined a Chinese Communist cell. (Note: The date of this has been controversial. Most writers, such as Gao (41), now accept March 1921. Several of these cells were established in late 1920 and early 1921. The cells were organized before the Chinese Communist Party was established in July 1921, so there is some controversy over the membership status of cell members.) Zhou was recruited by Zhang Shenfu, whom he had met in August of the previous year in connection with Li Dazhao. He also knew Zhang through Zhang's wife, Liu Qingyang, a member of the Awakening Society. Zhou has sometimes been portrayed at this time as uncertain in his politics, but his swift move to Communism suggests otherwise. (Note: In addition to noting the uncertain status of cell members versus party members, Levine (151 n47) questions whether Zhou was at this point a "stalwart" Communist in his beliefs.)

The cell Zhou belonged to was based in Paris; in addition to Zhou, Zhang, and Liu it included two other students, Zhao Shiyan and Chen Gongpei. Over the next several months, this group eventually formed a united organization with a group of Chinese radicals from Hunan, who were living in Montargis south of Paris. This group included such later prominent figures as Cai Hesen, Li Lisan, Chen Yi, Nie Rongzhen, Deng Xiaoping, and also Guo Longzhen, another member of the Awakening Society. Unlike Zhou, most of the students in this group were participants in the work-study program. A series of conflicts with the Chinese administrators of the program over low pay and poor working conditions resulted in over a hundred students occupying the program's offices at the Sino-French Institute in Lyon in September 1921. The students, including several people from the Montargis group, were arrested and deported. Zhou was apparently not one of the occupying students and remained in France until February or March 1922, when he moved with Zhang and Liu from Paris to Berlin. Zhou's move to Berlin was perhaps because the relatively "lenient" political atmosphere in Berlin made it more favorable as a base for overall European organizing. In addition, the Western European Secretariat of the Comintern was located in Berlin and it is clear that Zhou had important Comintern connections, though the nature of these is disputed. After moving operations to Germany, Zhou regularly shuttled between Paris and Berlin.

Zhou participated in the Diligent Work-Frugal Study Movement.

Zhou returned to Paris by June 1922, where he was one of the twenty two participants present at the organization of the Chinese Youth Communist Party, established as the European Branch of the Chinese Communist Party. (Note: This description is based on Lee 161. Other sources give varying dates, places, and numbers of people.) Zhou helped draft the party's charter and was elected to the three member executive committee as director of propaganda. He also wrote for and helped edit the party magazine, Shaonian (Youth), later renamed Chiguang (Red Light). It was in Zhou's capacity as general editor of this magazine that Zhou first met Deng Xiaoping, only seventeen years old, whom Zhou hired to operate a mimeograph (copy) machine. The party went through several reorganizations and name changes, but Zhou remained a key member of the group throughout his stay in Europe. Other important activities Zhou undertook included recruiting and transporting students for the University of the Toilers of the East in Moscow, and the establishment of the Chinese Nationalist Party (Kuomintang or KMT) European branch.

In June 1923, the Third Congress of the Chinese Communist Party accepted the Comintern's instructions to ally with the KMT, led at the time by Sun Yat-sen. These instructions called for CCP members to join the Nationalist Party as "individuals", while still retaining their association with the CCP. After joining the KMT, they would work to lead and direct it, transforming it into a vehicle of revolution. Within several years, this strategy would become the source of serious conflict between the KMT and the CCP.

As well as joining the KMT, Zhou helped organize the founding of the Nationalist Party European branch in November 1923. Under Zhou's influence, most of the European branch's officers were in fact communists. Zhou's wide-ranging contacts and personal relationships formed during this period were central to his career. Important party leaders, such as Zhu De and Nie Rongzhen, were first admitted to the party by Zhou.

By 1924, the Soviet-Nationalist alliance was expanding rapidly and Zhou was summoned back to China for further work. He left Europe probably in late July 1924, (Note: Lee cites Zhou's last public activity in Europe as a Nationalist Party farewell dinner on 24 July.) returning to China as one of the most senior Chinese Communist Party members in Europe.

== Political and military work in Whampoa ==
=== Establishment in Guangzhou ===
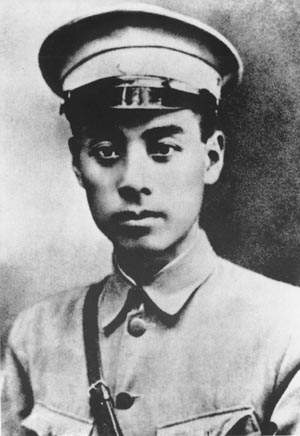
Zhou Enlai as the director of the Political Department at Whampoa Military Academy (1924)

Zhou returned to China in late August or early September 1924 to join the Political Department of the Whampoa Military Academy, probably through the influence of Zhang Shenfu, who had previously worked there. Zhou was Whampoa's chief political officer. While he was serving in Whampoa, Zhou was also made the secretary of the Communist Party of Guangdong-Guangxi, and served as the CCP representative with the rank of major-general.

The island of Whampoa, ten miles downriver from Guangzhou, was at the heart of the Soviet-Nationalist Party alliance. Conceived as the training center of the Nationalist Party Army, it was to provide the military base from which the Nationalists would launch their campaign to unify China, which was split into dozens of military satrapies. From its beginning, the school was funded, armed, and partly staffed by the Soviets.

The Political Department, where Zhou worked, was responsible for political indoctrination and control. As a result, Zhou was a prominent figure at most Academy meetings, often addressing the school immediately after commandant Chiang Kai-shek. He was extremely influential in establishing the political department/party representative (commissar) system which was adopted in Nationalist armed forces in 1925.

Concurrent with his Whampoa appointment, Zhou became secretary of the Communist Party's Guangdong Provincial Committee, and at some point a member of the Provincial Committee's Military Section. (Note: "Secretary of provincial committee" is according to Barnouin and Yu, 32. Other works give different dates and positions. His work in the Provincial Military Section probably came a little later, see Barnouin and Yu 35.) Zhou vigorously extended Communist influence at the academy. He soon arranged for a number of other prominent Communists to join the Political Department, including Chen Yi, Nie Rongzhen, Yun Daiying, and Xiong Xiong. Zhou played an important role in establishing the Young Soldiers Association, a youth group which was dominated by the Communists, and Sparks, a short-lived Communist front group. He thus recruited numerous new Communist party members from cadet ranks, and eventually set up a covert Communist Party branch at the academy to direct the new members. When Nationalists concerned with the increasing number of Communist members and organizations at Whampoa set up a "Society for Sun Yat-senism", Zhou attempted to squelch it; the conflict between these student groups set the background for Zhou's removal from the academy.

=== Military activities ===
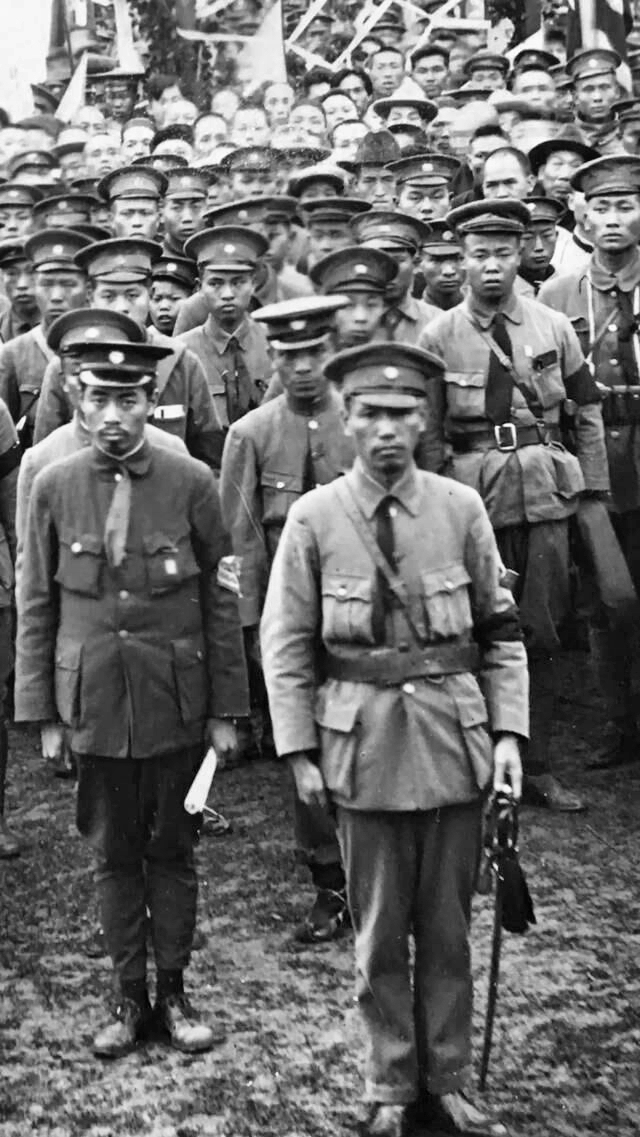
Chiang Kai-shek (center) and Zhou Enlai (left) with cadets at Whampoa Military Academy (1924)

Zhou participated in two military operations conducted by the Nationalist regime in 1925, later known as the first and second Eastern Expeditions. The first was in January 1925 when Chen Jiongming, an important Cantonese military leader previously driven out of Guangzhou by Sun Yat-sen, attempted to retake Guangzhou. The Nationalist regime's campaign against Chen consisted of forces from the Guangdong Army under Xu Chongzhi, and two training regiments of the Nationalist Party Army, led by Chiang Kai-shek and staffed by Academy officers and cadets. (Note: As Wilbur notes, Russian advisors played important roles in these early campaigns.) The fighting lasted through May 1925, with the defeat, but not destruction, of Chen's forces. Zhou accompanied the Whampoa cadets on the expedition as a political officer.

When Chen regrouped and attacked Guangzhou again in September 1925, the Nationalists launched a second expedition. Nationalist forces by this time had been reorganized into five corps (or armies) and adopted the commissar system with Political Departments and Nationalist party representatives in most divisions. The First Corps, made up of the Nationalist Party Army, was led by Whampoa graduates and commanded by Chiang Kai-shek, who personally appointed Zhou director of the First Corps Political Department. Soon after, the Nationalist Party's Central Executive Committee appointed Zhou Nationalist Party party representative, making Zhou chief commissar of the First Corps. The first major battle of expedition saw the capture of Chen's base in Huizhou on 15 October. Shantou was taken on 6 November, and by the end of 1925, the Nationalists controlled all of Guangdong province.

Zhou's appointment as chief commissar of the First Corps allowed him to appoint Communists as commissars in four of the Corps' five divisions. Following the conclusion of the Expedition, Zhou was appointed special commissioner for the East River District, which placed him in temporary administrative control of several counties; he apparently used this opportunity to establish a Communist party branch in Shantou and strengthen the CCP's control of local unions. This marked the high point of Zhou's time at Whampoa.

=== Political activities ===
In personal terms, 1925 was also an important year for Zhou. Zhou had kept in touch with Deng Yingchao, whom he had met in the Awakening Society while in Tianjin; and, in January 1925, Zhou asked for and received permission from CCP authorities to marry Deng. The two married in Guangzhou on 8 August 1925.

Zhou's work at Whampoa came to an end with the Zhongshan Warship Incident of 20 March 1926, in which a gunboat with a mostly Communist crew moved from Whampoa to Guangzhou without Chiang's knowledge or approval. This event led to Chiang's exclusion of Communists from the academy by May 1926, and the removal of numerous Communists from high positions in the Nationalist Party. In his memoirs, Nie Rongzhen suggested that the gunboat had moved in protest of Zhou Enlai's (brief) arrest. {{Clarify}}

Zhou's time in Whampoa was a significant period in his career. His pioneering work as a political officer in the military made him an important Communist Party expert in this key area; much of his later career centered on the military. Zhou's work in the CCP Guangdong Regional Committee Military Section was typical of his covert activities in the period. The Section was a secret group consisting of three members of the Provincial Central Committee, and was first responsible for organizing and directing CCP nuclei in the army itself. These nuclei, organized at the regimental level and above, were "illegal", meaning they were formed without Nationalist knowledge or authorization. The Section was also responsible for organizing similar nuclei in other armed groups, including secret societies and key services such as railroads and waterways. Zhou did extensive work in these areas until the final separation of the Nationalist and Communist parties and the end of the Soviet-Nationalist alliance in 1927.

== Nationalist-Communist split ==
=== Extent of cooperation ===
Zhou's activities immediately after his removal from his positions at Whampoa are uncertain. An earlier biographer claims that Chiang Kai-shek put Zhou in charge of "an advanced training center for the CCP members and commissars withdrawn from the army". More recent Chinese Communist sources claim that Zhou had an important role at this time in securing Communist control of Ye Ting's Independent Regiment. The regiment and Ye Ting later played a leading role in the Communists' first major military action, the Nanchang Revolt.

In July 1926, the Nationalists began the Northern Expedition, a massive military attempt to unify China. The Expedition was led by Chiang Kai-shek and the National Revolutionary Army (NRA), an amalgam of earlier military forces with significant guidance from Russian military advisors and numerous Communists as both commanding and political officers. With the early successes of the Expedition, there was soon a race between Chiang Kai-shek leading the "right-wing" of the Nationalist Party and the Communists, running inside the "left-wing" of the Nationalists, for control of major southern cities such as Nanjing and Shanghai. At this point the Chinese portion of Shanghai was controlled by Sun Chuanfang, one of the militarists targeted by the North Expedition. Distracted by fighting with the NRA and defections from his army, Sun reduced his forces in Shanghai, and the Communists, whose party headquarters was located in Shanghai, made three attempts to seize control of the city, later called "the three Shanghai Uprisings", in October 1926, February 1927, and March 1927.

=== Activities in Shanghai ===
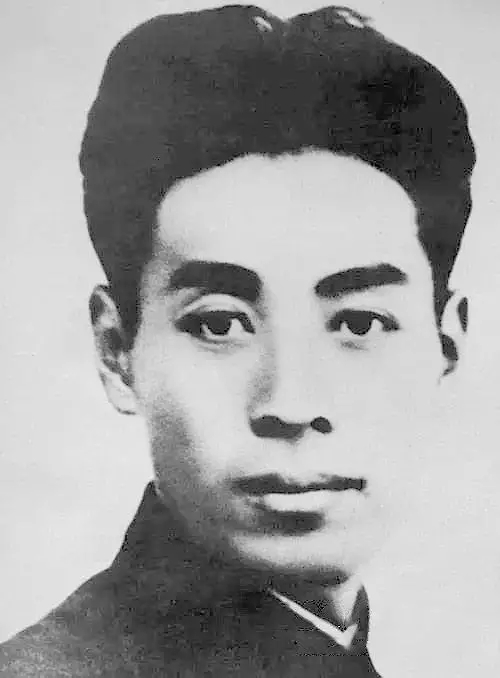
Zhou Enlai (1927)

Zhou was transferred to Shanghai to assist in these activities, probably in late 1926. It seems he was not present for the first uprising on 23–24 October, but he was certainly in Shanghai by December 1926. Early accounts credit Zhou with labor organizing activities in Shanghai after his arrival, or, more credibly, working to "strengthen the indoctrination of political workers in labor unions and smuggle arms for the strikers." Reports that Zhou "organized" or "ordered" the second and third uprisings on 20 February and 21 March exaggerate his role. Major decisions during this period were made by the Communist head in Shanghai, Chen Duxiu, the Party's general secretary, with a special committee of eight party officials coordinating Communist actions. The committee also consulted closely on decisions with the Comintern representatives in Shanghai, headed by Grigori Voitinsky. The partial documentation available for this period shows that Zhou headed the Communist Party Central Committee's Military Commission in Shanghai. He participated in both the February and March actions, but was not the guiding hand in either event, instead working with A. P. Appen, the Soviet military advisor to the Central Committee, training the pickets of the General Labor Union, the Communist controlled labor organization in Shanghai. He also worked to make union strong arm squads more effective when the Communists declared a "Red Terror" after the failed February uprising; this action resulted in the murder of twenty "anti-union" figures, and the kidnapping, beating, and intimidation of others associated with anti-union activities.

The third Communist uprising in Shanghai took place from 20 to 21 March. Approximately 600,000 rioting workers cut power and telephone lines and seized the city's post office, police headquarters, and railway stations, often after heavy fighting. During this uprising, the insurrectionists were under strict orders not to harm foreigners, which they obeyed. The forces of Sun Chuanfang withdrew and the uprising was successful, despite the small number of armed forces available. The first Nationalist troops entered the city the next day.

As the Communists attempted to install a soviet municipal government, conflict began between the Nationalists and Communists, and on 12 April Nationalist forces, including both members of the Green Gang and soldiers under the command of Nationalist general Pai Ch'ung-hsi attacked the Communists and quickly overcame them. On the eve of the Nationalist attack, Wang Shouhua, who was both the head of the CCP Labor Committee and the Chairman of the General Labor Committee, accepted a dinner invitation from "Big-eared Du" (a Shanghai gangster) and was strangled after he arrived. Zhou himself was nearly killed in a similar trap, when he was arrested after arriving at a dinner held at the headquarters of Si Lie, a Nationalist commander of Chiang's Twenty-sixth Army. Despite rumors that Chiang had put a high price on Zhou's head, he was quickly released by Pai Ch'ung-hsi's forces. The reasons for Zhou's sudden release may have been that Zhou was then the most senior Communist in Shanghai, that Chiang's efforts to exterminate the Shanghai Communists were highly secretive at the time, and that his execution would have been noticed as a violation of the cooperation agreement between the CCP and the KMT (which was technically still in effect). Zhou was finally only released after the intervention of a representative of the Twenty-sixth Army, Zhao Shu, who convinced his commanders that the arrest of Zhou had been a mistake.

=== Flight from Shanghai ===
Fleeing Shanghai, Zhou made his way to Hankou (now part of Wuhan) participated in the CCP's 5th National Congress there from 27 April to 9 May. At the end of the Congress, Zhou was elected to the Party's Central Committee, again heading the military department. After Chiang Kai-shek's suppression of the Communists, the Nationalist Party split in two, with the Nationalist Party's "left-wing" (led by Wang Jingwei) controlling the government in Hankou, and the party "right-wing" (led by Chiang Kai-shek) establishing a rival government in Nanjing. Still following Comintern instructions, the Communists remained as a "bloc inside" the Nationalist Party, hoping to continue expanding their influence through the Nationalists. After being attacked by a warlord friendly to Chiang, Wang's leftist government disintegrated later in May 1927, and Chiang's troops began an organized purge of Communists in territories formerly controlled by Wang. In mid-July Zhou was forced to go underground.

Pressured by their Comintern advisors, and themselves convinced that the "revolutionary high tide" had arrived, the Communists decided to launch a series of military revolts. The first of these was the Nanchang Revolt. Zhou was sent to oversee the event, but the moving figures seem to have been Tan Pingshan and Li Lisan, while the main military figures were Ye Ting and He Long. In military terms, the revolt was a disaster, with the Communists' forces decimated and scattered.

Zhou himself contracted malaria during the campaign and was secretly sent to Hong Kong for medical treatment by Nie Rongzhen and Ye Ting. After reaching Hong Kong, Zhou was disguised as a businessman named "Li" and entrusted to the care of local Communists. In a subsequent meeting of the CCP Central Committee, Zhou was blamed for the failure of the Nanchang campaign and temporarily demoted to being an alternate member of the Politburo.

== Activities during the Chinese Civil War ==
=== The Sixth Party Congress ===
After the failure of the Nanchang Uprising, Zhou left China for the Soviet Union to attend the Chinese Communist Party's (CCP) Sixth National Party Congress in Moscow, in June–July 1928. The Sixth Congress had to be held in Moscow because conditions in China were considered dangerous. KMT control was so tight that many Chinese delegates attending the Sixth Congress were forced to travel in disguise: Zhou himself was disguised as an antiquarian.

At the Sixth Congress, Zhou delivered a long speech insisting that conditions in China were unfavorable for immediate revolution, and that the main task of the CCP should be to develop revolutionary momentum by winning over the support of the masses in the countryside and establishing a Soviet regime in southern China, similar to the one that Mao Zedong and Zhu De were already establishing around Jiangxi. The Congress generally accepted Zhou's assessment as accurate. Xiang Zhongfa was made secretary general of the Party, but was soon found incapable of fulfilling his role, so Zhou emerged as the de facto leader of the CCP. Zhou was only thirty years old.

During the Sixth Congress, Zhou was elected Director of the Central Committee Organization Department. His ally, Li Lisan, took over propaganda work. Zhou finally returned to China, after more than a year abroad, in 1929. At the Sixth Congress in Moscow, Zhou had given figures indicating that, by 1928, fewer than 32,000 union members remained who were loyal to the Communists, and that only ten percent of Party members were proletarians. By 1929, only three percent of the Party were proletarians.

In early 1930, Zhou began to disagree with the timing of Li Lisan's strategy of favoring rich peasants and concentrating military forces for attacks on urban centers. Zhou did not openly break with these more orthodox notions, and even tried to implement them later, in 1931, in Jiangxi. When the Soviet agent Pavel Mif arrived in Shanghai to lead the Comintern in China in December 1930, Mif criticized Li's strategy as "left adventurism", and criticized Zhou for compromising with Li. Zhou "acknowledged" his mistakes in compromising with Li in January 1931 and offered to resign from the Politburo, but was retained while other senior CCP leaders, including Li Lisan and Qu Qiubai, were removed. As Mao later recognized, Mif understood that Zhou's services as Party leader were indispensable, and that Zhou would willingly cooperate with whoever was holding power.

=== Underground work: establishment ===
After arriving back in Shanghai in 1929, Zhou began to work underground, establishing and overseeing a network of independent Communist cells. Zhou's greatest danger in his underground work was the threat of being discovered by the KMT secret police, which had been established in 1928 with the specific mission of identifying and eliminating Communists. In order to avoid detection, Zhou and his wife changed residences at least once a month and used a variety of aliases. Zhou often disguised himself as a businessman, sometimes wearing a beard. Zhou was careful that only two or three people ever knew his whereabouts. Zhou disguised all urban Party offices, made sure that CCP offices never shared the same buildings when in the same city, and required all Party members to use passwords to identify one another. Zhou restricted all of his meetings to either before 7 am or after 7 pm. Zhou never used public transportation and avoided being seen in public places.

In November 1928, the CCP also established its own intelligence agency (the "Special Service section of the Central Committee", or "Zhongyang Teke" (Chinese: 中央特科), often abbreviated as Teke), which Zhou subsequently came to control. Zhou's chief lieutenants were Gu Shunzhang, who had strong ties to Chinese secret societies and became an alternate member of the Politburo, and Xiang Zhongfa. Teke had four operational sections: one for the protection and safety of Party members; one for intelligence gathering; one for facilitating internal communications; and one to conduct assassinations, a team that became known as the "Red Squad" (红队).

Zhou's main concern in running Teke was to establish an effective anti-espionage network within the KMT secret police. Within a short amount of time the head of Teke's intelligence section, Chen Geng, succeeded in planting a large network of moles inside the Investigation Section of the Central Operations Department in Nanjing, which was the center of KMT intelligence. The three most successful agents used by Zhou to infiltrate the KMT secret police were Qian Zhuangfei, Li Kenong, and Hu Di, whom Zhou referred to as "the three most distinguished intelligence workers of the Party" in the 1930s. Agents planted within various KMT offices were later critical in the survival of the CCP, helping the Party escape Chiang's Encirclement Campaigns.

=== KMT response to Zhou's intelligence work ===
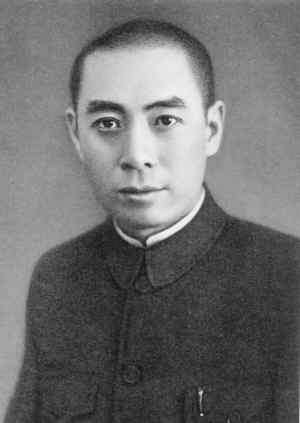
Zhou Enlai (1930s)

In late April 1931, Zhou's chief aide in security affairs, Gu Shunzhang, was arrested by the KMT in Wuhan. Gu was a former labor organizer with strong mafia connections and weak commitments to the CCP. Under threat of heavy torture, Gu gave the KMT secret police detailed accounts of underground CCP organizations in Wuhan, leading to the arrests and executions of over ten senior CCP leaders in the city. Gu offered to provide the KMT with details of CCP activities in Shanghai, but only if he could give the information directly to Chiang Kai-shek.

One of Zhou's agents working in Nanjing, Qian Zhuangfei, intercepted a telegram requesting further instructions from Nanjing on how to proceed, and abandoned his cover to personally warn Zhou of the impending crackdown. The two days before Gu arrived in Nanjing to meet with Chiang gave Zhou time to evacuate Party members and to change the communication codes used by Teke, all of which were known to Gu. After meeting briefly with Chiang in Nanjing, Gu arrived in Shanghai and assisted the KMT secret police in raiding CCP offices and residences, capturing members who could not be evacuated in time. The summary executions of those suspected of Communist sympathies resulted in the largest death-toll since the Shanghai massacre of 1927.

Zhou's reaction to Gu's betrayal was extreme. More than fifteen members of Gu's family, some of whom worked for Teke, were murdered by the Red Squad and buried in quiet residential areas of Shanghai. The Red Squad then assassinated Wang Bing, a leading member of the KMT secret police who was known for moving around Shanghai in rickshaws, without the protection of bodyguards. Most surviving CCP members were relocated to the Communist base in Jiangxi. Because most senior staff had become exposed by Gu, most of its best agents were also relocated. Zhou's most senior aide not yet under suspicion, Pan Hannian, became Teke's director.

The night before he was scheduled to leave Shanghai in June 1931, Xiang Zhongfa, who was one of Zhou's most senior agents, decided to spend the night in a hotel with his mistress, ignoring Zhou's warnings about the danger. In the morning, a KMT informant who had been trailing Xiang spotted him as he was leaving the hotel. Xiang was immediately arrested and imprisoned within the French Concession. Zhou attempted to prevent Xiang's expected extradition to KMT-controlled China by having his agents bribe the chief of police in the French Concession, but the KMT authorities appealed directly to the authorities of the French Concession, ensuring that the chief of police could not intervene. Zhou's hopes that Xiang would be transferred to Nanjing, giving him an opportunity to kidnap Xiang, also came to naught. The French agreed to transfer Xiang to the Shanghai Garrison Headquarters, under the command of General Xiong Shihui, who subjected Xiang to relentless torture and interrogation. Once he became convinced that Xiang had given his torturers all the information that they requested, Chiang Kai-shek ordered Xiang to be executed.

Zhou Enlai later succeeded in secretly purchasing a copy of Xiang's interrogation records. The records showed that Xiang had disclosed everything to the KMT authorities before his execution, including the location of Zhou's residence. Another round of arrests and executions followed Xiang's capture, but Zhou and his wife escaped capture because they had abandoned their apartment on the morning of Xiang's arrest. After establishing a new Politburo Standing Committee in Shanghai, Zhou and his wife relocated to the Communist base in Jiangxi near the end of 1931. By the time Zhou left Shanghai, he was one of the most wanted men in China.

=== The Jiangxi Soviet ===
Following the failed Nanchang and Autumn Harvest Uprisings of 1927, the Communists began to focus on establishing a series of rural bases of operation in southern China. Even before moving to Jiangxi, Zhou had become involved in the politics of these bases. Mao, claiming the need to eliminate counterrevolutionaries and Anti-Bolsheviks operating within the CCP, began an ideological purge of the populace inside the Jiangxi Soviet. Zhou, perhaps due to his own success planting moles within various levels of the KMT, agreed that an organized campaign to uncover subversion was justified, and supported the campaign as de facto leader of the CCP.

Mao's efforts soon developed into a ruthless campaign driven by paranoia and aimed not only at KMT spies, but at anyone with an ideological outlook different from Mao's. Suspects were commonly tortured until they confessed to their crimes and accused others of crimes, and wives and relatives who inquired of those being tortured were themselves arrested and tortured even more severely. Mao's attempts to purge the Red Army of those who might potentially oppose him led Mao to accuse Chen Yi, the commander and political commissar of the Jiangxi Military Region, as a counterrevolutionary, provoking a violent reaction against Mao's persecutions that became known as the "Futian Incident" in January 1931. Mao was eventually successful in subduing the Red Army, reducing its numbers from forty thousand to less than ten thousand. The campaign continued throughout 1930 and 1931. Historians estimate the total number who died due to Mao's persecution in all base areas to be approximately one hundred thousand.

The entire campaign occurred while Zhou was still in Shanghai. Although he had supported the elimination of counterrevolutionaries, Zhou actively suppressed the campaign when he arrived in Jiangxi in December 1931, criticizing the "excess, the panic, and the oversimplification" practiced by local officials. After investigating those accused of anti-Bolshevism, and those persecuting them, Zhou submitted a report criticizing the campaign for focusing on the narrow persecution of anti-Maoists as anti-Bolsheviks, exaggerating the threat to the Party, and condemning the use of torture as an investigative technique. Zhou's resolution was passed and adopted on 7 January 1932, and the campaign gradually subsided.

Zhou moved to the Jiangxi base area and shook up the propaganda-oriented approach to revolution by demanding that the armed forces under Communist control actually be used to expand the base, rather than just to control and defend it. In December 1931, Zhou replaced Mao Zedong as Secretary of the First Front Army with Xiang Ying, and made himself political commissar of the Red Army, in place of Mao. Liu Bocheng, Lin Biao, and Peng Dehuai all criticized Mao's tactics at the October 1932 Ningdu Conference.

After moving to Jiangxi, Zhou met Mao for the first time since 1927, and began his long relationship with Mao as his superior. In the Ningdu conference, Mao was demoted to being a figurehead in the Soviet government. Zhou, who had come to appreciate Mao's strategies after the series of military failures waged by other Party leaders since 1927, defended Mao, but was unsuccessful. After achieving power, Mao later purged or demoted those who had opposed him in 1932, but remembered Zhou's defense of his policies.

=== Chiang's Encirclement Campaigns ===
In early 1933, Bo Gu arrived with the German Comintern advisor Otto Braun and took control of party affairs. Zhou at this time, apparently with strong support from Party and military colleagues, reorganized and standardized the Red Army. Under Zhou, Bo, and Braun, the Red Army defeated four attacks by Chiang Kai-shek's Nationalist troops. The military structure that led the Communists to victory was:

Leaders	Unit Designation
Lin Biao, Nie Rongzhen	1st Corps
Peng Dehuai, Yang Shangkun	3rd Corps
Xiao Jinguang	7th Corps
Xiao Ke	8th Corps
Luo Binghui	9th Corps
Fang Zhimin	10th Corps

Chiang's fifth campaign, launched in September 1933, was much more difficult to contain. Chiang's new use of "blockhouse tactics" and larger numbers of troops allowed his army to advance steadily into Communist territory, and they succeeded in seizing several major Communist strongholds. Bo Gu and Otto Braun adopted orthodox tactics to respond to Chiang, and Zhou, although personally opposed to them, directed these. Following their subsequent defeat, he and other military leaders were blamed.

Although Zhou's subsequently cautious military approach was distrusted by hardliners, he was again appointed to the position of vice chairman of the Military Commission. Zhou was accepted as leader largely because of his organizational talent and devotion to work, and because he had never shown any overt ambition to pursue supreme power within the Party. Within months, the continuing orthodox tactics of Bo and Braun led to a serious defeat for the Red Army, and forced the leaders of the CCP to seriously consider abandoning their bases in Jiangxi.

=== The Long March ===
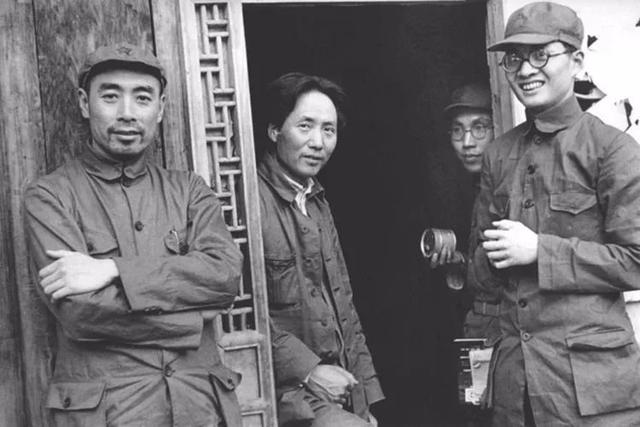
Zhou (far left) with Mao Zedong (center-left) and Bo Gu (far right) in Yan'an (1935)

After the decision to abandon Jiangxi was announced, Zhou was placed in charge of organizing and supervising the logistics of the Communist withdrawal. Making his plans in absolute secrecy and waiting till the last moment to inform even senior leaders of the group's movements, Zhou's objective was to break through the enemy encirclement with as few casualties as possible, and before Chiang's forces completely occupied all Communist bases. It is not known what criteria were used to determine who would stay and who would go, but 16,000 troops and some of the Communists' most notable commanders at the time (including Xiang Ying, Chen Yi, Tan Zhenlin, and Qu Qiubai) were left to form a rear guard to divert the main force of Nationalist troops from noticing the Communists' general withdrawal.

The withdrawal of 84,000 soldiers and civilians began in early October 1934. Zhou's intelligence agents were successful in identifying a large section of Chiang's blockhouse lines that were manned by troops under General Chen Jitang, a Guangdong warlord who Zhou identified as being likely to prefer preserving the strength of his troops over fighting. Zhou sent Pan Hannian to negotiate for safe passage with General Chen, who subsequently allowed the Red Army to pass through the territory that he controlled without fighting.

After passing through three of the four blockhouse fortifications needed to escape Chiang's encirclement, the Red Army was finally intercepted by regular Nationalist troops, and suffered heavy casualties. Of the 86,000 Communists who attempted to break out of Jiangxi, only 36,000 successfully escaped. This loss demoralized some Communist leaders (particularly Bo Gu and Otto Braun), but Zhou remained calm and retained his command.

During the Communists' subsequent Long March, there were numerous high-level disputes over the direction that the Communists should take, and on the causes of the Red Army's defeats. During the power struggles that ensued, Zhou consistently backed Mao Zedong against the interests of Bo Gu and Otto Braun. Bo and Braun were later blamed for the Red Army's defeats, and were eventually removed from their positions of leadership. The Communists eventually succeeded in re-establishing a base in northern Shaanxi on 20 October 1935, arriving with only 8,000–9,000 remaining members.

Zhou's position within the CCP changed numerous times throughout the Long March. By the early 1930s, Zhou was recognized as the de facto leader of the CCP, and exercised superior influence over other members of the CCP even when sharing power with Bo and Braun. In the months following the January 1935 Zunyi Conference, in which Bo and Braun were removed from senior positions, Zhou mostly retained his position because he displayed a willingness to display responsibility, because his tactics in defeating Chiang's Fourth Encirclement Campaign were recognized as being successful, and because he supported Mao Zedong, who was gaining influence inside the Party: after the Zunyi Conference, Mao became Zhou's assistant. After the Communists reached Shaanxi and completed the Long March, Mao officially took over Zhou Enlai's leading position in the CCP, while Zhou took a secondary position as vice-chairman. Mao and Zhou would retain their positions within the CCP until their deaths in 1976.

Zhou was unsuccessful in averting the public defection of Zhang Guotao, one of the founders of the CCP, to the KMT. Zhang was prepared to defect due to a disagreement with Mao Zedong over the implementation of the united front policy, and because he resented Mao's authoritarian leadership style. Zhou, with the aid of Wang Ming, Bo Gu, and Li Kenong, intercepted Zhang after he arrived in Wuhan, and engaged in extensive negotiations through April 1938, in order to convince Zhang not to defect, but these negotiations were unsuccessful. In the end, Zhang refused to compromise and placed himself under the protection of the KMT secret police. On 18 April, the CCP Central Committee expelled Zhang from the Party, and Zhang himself issued a statement accusing the CCP of sabotaging efforts to resist the Japanese. The entire episode was a serious setback for Zhou's attempts to improve the prestige of the Party.

=== The Xi'an Incident ===
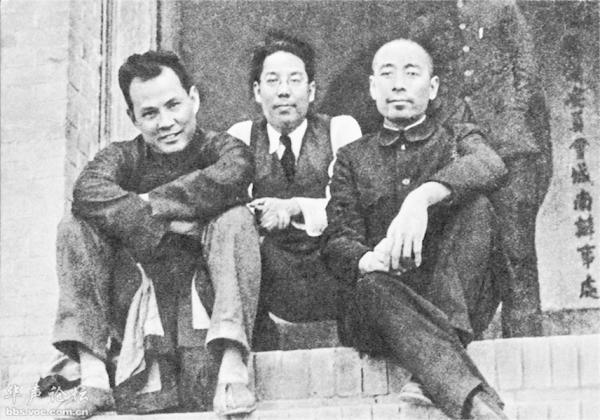
Zhou with Communist general Ye Jianying (left) and Kuomintang official Zhang Zhong (center) in Xi'an 1937, illustrating the alliance between the two parties which was the outcome of the Xi'an Incident

During the seventh congress of the Comintern, held in August 1936, Wang Ming issued an anti-Fascist manifesto, indicating that the CCP's previous policy of "opposing Chiang Kai-shek and resisting Japan" was to be replaced by a policy of "uniting with Chiang Kai-shek to resist Japan". Zhou was instrumental in carrying out this policy. Zhou made contact with one of the most senior KMT commanders in the northwest, Zhang Xueliang. By 1935, Zhang was well known for his anti-Japanese sentiments and his doubts about Chiang's willingness to oppose the Japanese. Zhang's disposition made him easily influenced by Zhou's indications that the CCP would cooperate to fight against the Japanese.

Zhou established a "northeast working committee" for the purpose of promoting cooperation with Zhang. The committee worked to persuade Zhang's Northeast Army to unite with the Red Army to fight Japan and retake Manchuria. The committee also created new patriotic slogans, including "Chinese must not fight Chinese", to promote Zhou's goals. Using his network of secret contacts, Zhou arranged a meeting with Zhang in Yan'an, then controlled by Zhang's "Northeast Army".

The first meeting between Zhou and Zhang occurred inside a church on 7 April 1936. Zhang showed a great interest in ending the civil war, uniting the country, and fighting the Japanese, but warned that Chiang was firmly in control of the national government, and that these goals would be difficult to pursue without Chiang's cooperation. Both parties ended their meeting with an agreement to find a way to secretly work together. At the same time that Zhou was establishing secret contacts with Zhang, Chiang was growing suspicious of Zhang, and became increasingly dissatisfied with Zhang's inaction against the Communists. In order to deceive Chiang, Zhou and Zhang deployed mock military units in order to give the impression that the Northeast Army and the Red Army were engaged in battle.

In December 1936, Chiang Kai-shek flew to the Nationalist headquarters in Xi'an in order to test the loyalty of local KMT military forces under Marshal Zhang Xueliang, and to personally lead these forces in a final attack on Communist bases in Shaanxi, which Zhang had been ordered to destroy. Determined to force Chiang to direct China's forces against the Japanese (who had taken Zhang's territory of Manchuria and were preparing a broader invasion), on 12 December Zhang and his followers stormed Chiang's headquarters, killed most of his bodyguards, and seized the Generalissimo in what became known as the Xi'an Incident.

Reactions to Chiang's kidnapping in Yan'an were mixed. Some, including Mao Zedong and Zhu De, viewed it as an opportunity to have Chiang killed. Others, including Zhou Enlai and Zhang Wentian, saw it as an opportunity to achieve a united-front policy against the Japanese, which would strengthen the overall position of the CCP. Debate within Yan'an ended when a long telegram from Joseph Stalin arrived, urging the CCP to work toward Chiang's release, explaining that a united front was the best position from which to resist the Japanese, and that only Chiang had the prestige and authority to carry out such a plan.

After initial communications with Zhang on the fate of Chiang, Zhou Enlai reached Xi'an on 16 December, on a plane specifically sent for him by Zhang Xueliang, as the chief Communist negotiator. At first, Chiang was opposed to negotiating with a CCP delegate, but withdrew his opposition when it became clear that his life and freedom were largely dependent on Communist goodwill toward him. On 24 December, Chiang received Zhou for a meeting, the first time that the two had seen each other since Zhou had left Whampoa over ten years earlier. Zhou began the conversation by saying, "In the ten years since we have met, you seem to have aged very little." Chiang nodded and said: "Enlai, you were my subordinate. You should do what I say." Zhou replied that if Chiang would halt the civil war and resist the Japanese instead, the Red Army would willingly accept Chiang's command. By the end of this meeting, Chiang promised to end the civil war, to resist the Japanese together, and to invite Zhou to Nanjing for further talks.

On 25 December 1936, Zhang released Chiang and accompanied him to Nanjing. Subsequently, Zhang was court-martialed and sentenced to house arrest, and most of the officers who participated in the Xi'an Incident were executed. Although the KMT formally rejected collaboration with the CCP, Chiang ended active military activity against Communist bases in Yan'nan, implying that he had implicitly given his word to change the direction of his policies. Following the end of KMT attacks, the CCP consolidated its territories and prepared to resist the Japanese.

After news arrived that Zhang had been betrayed and arrested by Chiang, Zhang's old officer corps became very agitated, and some of them murdered a Nationalist general, Wang Yizhe, who was seen as largely responsible for the military's lack of response. While Zhou was still in Xi'an, he himself was surrounded in his office by a number of Zhang's officers, who accused the Communists of instigating the Xi'an Incident and of betraying Zhang by convincing the general to travel to Nanjing. At gunpoint, they threatened to kill Zhou. Ever the diplomat, Zhou maintained his composure and eloquently defended his position. In the end, Zhou succeeded in calming the officers, and they departed, leaving him unharmed.

In a series of negotiations with the KMT that lasted until June 1937 (when the Marco Polo Bridge Incident occurred), Zhou attempted to gain Zhang's release, but failed.

== Activities during World War II ==
=== Propaganda and intelligence in Wuhan ===
When the Nationalist capital of Nanjing fell to the Japanese on 13 December 1937, Zhou accompanied the Nationalist government to its temporary capital of Wuhan. As the chief representative of the CCP in the nominal KMT-CCP cooperation agreement, Zhou established and headed the official KMT-CCP liaison office. While running the liaison office, Zhou established the Yangtze Bureau of the Central Committee. Under cover of its association with the Eighth Route Army, Zhou used the Yangtze Bureau to conduct clandestine operations within southern China, secretly recruiting Communist operatives and establishing Party structures throughout KMT-controlled areas.

In August 1937, the CCP secretly issued orders to Zhou that his united front work was to focus on Communist infiltration and organization at all levels of the government and society. Zhou agreed to these orders, and applied his considerable organizational talents to completing them. Shortly after Zhou's arrival in Wuhan, he convinced the Nationalist government to approve and fund a Communist newspaper, the "New China Daily", justifying it as a tool to spread anti-Japanese propaganda. This newspaper became a major tool for spreading Communist propaganda, and the Nationalists later viewed its approval and funding as one of their "biggest mistakes".

Zhou was successful in organizing large numbers of Chinese intellectuals and artists to promote resistance against the Japanese. The largest propaganda event that Zhou staged was a week-long celebration in 1938, following the successful defense of Taierzhuang. In this event, between 400,000 and 500,000 people took part in parades, and a chorus of over 10,000 people sung songs of resistance. Fundraising efforts during the week raised over a million yuan. Zhou himself donated 240 yuan, his monthly salary as deputy director of the Political Department.

While he was working in Wuhan, Zhou was the CCP's main contact person with the outside world, and worked hard to reverse the public perception of the Communists as a "bandit organization". Zhou established and maintained contacts with over forty foreign journalists and writers, including Edgar Snow, Agnes Smedley, Anna Louise Strong, and Rewi Alley, many of whom became sympathetic to the Communist cause and wrote about their sympathies in foreign publications. In sympathy with his efforts to promote the CCP to the outside world, Zhou arranged for a Canadian medical team, headed by Norman Bethune, to travel to Yan'an, and assisted the Dutch film director Joris Ivens in producing a documentary, 400 Million People.

=== Military strategy in Wuhan ===
In January 1938, the Nationalist government appointed Zhou as the deputy director to the Political Department of the Military Committee, working directly under General Chen Cheng. As a senior Communist statesman holding the rank of lieutenant-general, Zhou was the only Communist to hold a high-level position within the Nationalist government. Zhou used his influence within the Military Committee to promote Nationalist generals that he believed were capable, and to promote cooperation with the Red Army.

In the Tai'erzhuang campaign, Zhou used his influence to ensure that the most capable Nationalist general available, Li Zongren be appointed overall commander, despite Chiang's reservations about Li's loyalty. When Chiang was hesitant to commit troops to the defense of Tai'erzhuang, Zhou convinced Chiang to do so by promising that the Communist Eighth Route Army would simultaneously attack the Japanese from the north, and that the New Fourth Army would sabotage the Tianjin-Pukou railroad, cutting off Japanese supplies. In the end, the defense of Tai'erzhuang was a major victory for the Nationalists, killing 20,000 Japanese soldiers and capturing a large quantity of supplies and equipment.

=== Adoption of orphans ===
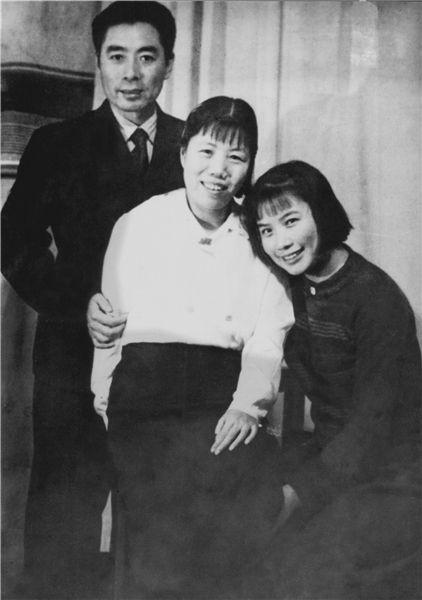
Zhou (left) with his wife Deng Yingchao (center) and Sun Weishi

While serving as the CCP ambassador to the KMT, the childless Zhou met and befriended numerous orphans. While in Wuhan Zhou adopted a young girl, Sun Weishi, in 1937. Sun's mother had taken her to Wuhan after Sun's father was executed by the KMT in 1927, during the White Terror. Zhou came upon the sixteen-year-old Sun crying outside of the Eighth Route Army Liaison Office because she had been refused permission to travel to Yan'an, due to her youth and lack of political connections. After Zhou befriended and adopted her as his daughter, Sun was permitted to travel to Yan'an. She pursued a career in acting and direction, and later became the first female director of spoken drama (huaju) in the PRC.

Zhou also adopted Sun's brother, Sun Yang. After accompanying Zhou to Yan'an, Sun Yang became Zhou's personal assistant. After the founding of the People's Republic of China, Sun Yang became the president of Renmin University.

In 1938, Zhou met and befriended another orphan, Li Peng. Li was only three when, in 1931, his father was also killed by the Kuomintang. Zhou subsequently looked after him in Yan'an. After the war, Zhou systematically groomed Li for leadership and sent him to be educated in energy-related engineering in Moscow. Zhou's placement of Li within the powerful energy bureaucracy shielded Li from Red Guards during the Cultural Revolution, and Li's eventual rise to the level of Premier surprised no one.

=== Flight to Chongqing ===
When the Japanese army approached Wuhan in the fall of 1938, the Nationalist Army engaged the Japanese in the surrounding regions for over four months, allowing the KMT to withdraw farther inland, to Chongqing, bringing with them important supplies, assets, and many refugees. While he was en route to Chongqing, Zhou was nearly killed in the "fire of Changsha", which lasted for three days, destroyed two thirds of the city, killed twenty thousand civilians, and left hundreds of thousands of people homeless. This fire was deliberately caused by the retreating Nationalist army in order to prevent the city from falling to the Japanese. Due to an organizational error (it was claimed), the fire was begun without any warning to the residents of the city.

After escaping from Changsha, Zhou took refuge in a Buddhist temple in a nearby village and organized the evacuation of the city. Zhou demanded that the causes of the fire be thoroughly investigated by authorities, that those responsible be punished, that reparations be given to the victims, that the city be thoroughly cleaned up, and that accommodations be provided for the homeless. In the end, the Nationalists blamed three local commanders for the fire and executed them. Newspapers across China blamed the fire on (non-KMT) arsonists, but the blaze contributed to a nationwide loss of support for the KMT.

=== Early activities in Chongqing ===
Zhou Enlai reached Chongqing in December 1938, and resumed the official and unofficial operations that he had been conducting in Wuhan in January 1938. Zhou's activities included those required by his formal positions within the Nationalist government, his running of two pro-Communist newspapers, and his covert efforts to form reliable intelligence networks and increase the popularity and organization of CCP organizations in southern China. At its peak, the staff working under him in both official and covert roles totaled several hundred people. After finding that his father, Zhou Shaogang, was unable to support himself, Zhou looked after his father in Chongqing until his father's death in 1942.

Soon after arriving in Chongqing, Zhou successfully lobbied the Nationalist government to release Communist political prisoners. After their release, Zhou often assigned these former prisoners as agents to organize and lead Party organizations throughout southern China. The efforts of Zhou's covert activities were extremely successful, increasing CCP membership across southern China tenfold within months. Chiang was somewhat aware of these activities and introduced efforts to suppress them but was generally unsuccessful.

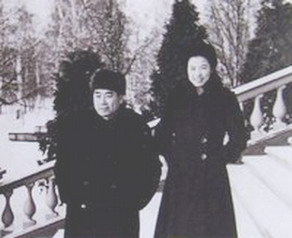
Zhou Enlai and Sun Weishi in Moscow, 1939.

In July 1939, while in Yan'an to attend a series of Politburo meetings, Zhou had an accident horseback riding in which he fell and fractured his right elbow. Because there was little medical care available in Yan'an, Zhou traveled to Moscow for medical treatment, using the occasion to brief the Comintern on the status of the united front. Zhou arrived in Moscow too late to mend the fracture, and his right arm remained bent for the rest of his life. Joseph Stalin was so displeased with the CCP's refusal to work more closely with the Nationalists that he refused to see Zhou during his stay. Zhou's adopted daughter, Sun Weishi, accompanied Zhou to Moscow. She remained in Moscow after Zhou left in order to study for a career in theater.

=== Intelligence work in Chongqing ===
On 4 May 1939, the Politburo accepted Zhou's assessment that Zhou should focus his efforts on creating a network of secret CCP agents working covertly and for long periods. Communists were directed to join the KMT, if doing so would increase the ability of agents to infiltrate the KMT administrative, educational, economic, and military establishments. Under the cover of the Office of the Eighth Route Army (moved to a stately building on the outskirts of Chongqing), Zhou adopted a series of measures to expand the CCP intelligence network.

By the time that Zhou returned to Chongqing in May 1940, a serious rift had formed between the KMT and the CCP. Over the course of the next year, the relationship between the two parties degenerated into arrests and executions of Party members, covert attempts by agents of both sides to eliminate each other, propaganda efforts attacking each other, and major military clashes. The united front was officially abolished after the Anhui Incident in January 1941, when 9,000 Communist soldiers of the New Fourth Army were ambushed, and their commanders either killed or imprisoned by government troops.

Zhou responded to the rift between the KMT and CCP by directing Party leaders to conduct their operations more secretly. He maintained propaganda efforts via the newspapers that he directed and kept in close contact with foreign journalists and ambassadors. Zhou increased and improved CCP intelligence efforts within the KMT, Wang Jingwei's Nanjing government, and the Empire of Japan, recruiting, training, and organizing a large network of Communist spies. Yan Baohang, a secret Party member active in Chongqing diplomatic circles, informed Zhou that German dictator Adolf Hitler was planning to attack the Soviet Union on 22 June 1941. Under Zhou's signature, this information reached Stalin on 20 June, two days before Hitler attacked, though Stalin did not yet believe that Hitler would actually carry through with the attack.

=== Economic and diplomatic activities ===
Despite worsening relations with Chiang Kai-shek, Zhou operated openly in Chongqing, befriending Chinese and foreign visitors and staging public cultural activities, especially Chinese theater. Zhou cultivated a close personal friendship with General Feng Yuxiang, making it possible for Zhou to circulate freely among the officers of the Nationalist Army. Zhou befriended the General He Jifeng, and convinced He to secretly become a member of the CCP during an official visit to Yan'an. Zhou's intelligence agents penetrated the Sichuanese army of General Deng Xihou, resulting in Deng's secret agreement to supply ammunition to the Communist New Fourth Army. Zhou convinced another Sichuanese general, Li Wenhui, to covertly install a radio transmitter that facilitated secret communication between Yan'an and Chongqing. Zhou befriended Zhang Zhizhong and Nong Yun, commanders in the Yunnan armed forces, who became secret CCP members, agreed to cooperate with the CCP against Chiang Kai-shek, and established a clandestine radio station that broadcast Communist propaganda from the provincial government building in Kunming.

Zhou remained the primary CCP representative to the outside world during his time in Chongqing. Zhou and his aides Qiao Guanhua, Gong Peng, and Wang Bingnan enjoyed receiving foreign visitors and made a favorable impression among American, British, Canadian, Russian, and other foreign diplomats. Zhou struck visitors as charming, urbane, hard-working, and living a very simple lifestyle. In 1941, Zhou received a visit from Ernest Hemingway and his wife, Martha Gellhorn. Gellhorn later wrote that she and Ernest were extremely impressed with Zhou (and extremely unimpressed with Chiang), and they became convinced that the Communists would take over China after meeting him.

Because Yan'an was incapable of funding Zhou's activities, Zhou partially funded his efforts through donations from sympathetic foreigners, overseas Chinese, and the China Defense League (supported by Sun Yat-sen's widow, Soong Ching-ling). Zhou also undertook to start and run a number of businesses throughout KMT- and Japanese-controlled China. Zhou's businesses grew to include several trading companies operating in several Chinese cities (primarily Chongqing and Hong Kong), a silk and satin store in Chongqing, an oil refinery, and factories for producing industrial materials, cloths, Western medicines, and other commodities.

Under Zhou, Communist businessmen made great profits in currency trading and commodity speculation, especially in American dollars and gold. Zhou's most lucrative business was generated by several opium plantations that Zhou established in remote areas. Although the CCP had been engaged in the eradication of opium smoking since its establishment, Zhou justified opium production and distribution in KMT-controlled areas by the huge profits generated for the CCP, and by the debilitating effects that opium addiction might have on KMT soldiers and government officials.

=== Relationship with Mao Zedong ===
In 1943, Zhou's relationship with Chiang Kai-shek deteriorated, and he returned permanently to Yan'an. By then, Mao Zedong had emerged as the Chairman of the Chinese Communist Party and was attempting to have his political theories (literally "Mao Zedong Thought") accepted as the Party's doctrine. Following his ascent to power, Mao organized a campaign to indoctrinate the members of the CCP. This campaign became the foundation of the Maoist personality cult that later dominated Chinese politics until the end of the Cultural Revolution.

After returning to Yan'an, Zhou Enlai was strongly and excessively criticized in this campaign. Zhou was labeled, along with the generals Peng Dehuai, Liu Bocheng, Ye Jianying, and Nie Rongzhen, as an "empiricist" because he had a history of cooperating with the Comintern and with Mao's enemy, Wang Ming. Mao publicly attacked Zhou as "a collaborator and assistant of dogmatism... who belittled the study of Marxism-Leninism". Mao and his allies then claimed that the CCP organizations that Zhou had established in southern China were in fact led by KMT secret agents, a charge which Zhou firmly denied, and which was only withdrawn after Mao became convinced of Zhou's loyalty in the latest period of the campaign.

Zhou defended himself by engaging in a long series of public reflections and self-criticisms, and he gave a number of speeches praising Mao and Mao Zedong Thought and giving his unconditional acceptance of Mao's leadership. He also joined Mao's allies in attacking Peng Shuzhi, Chen Duxiu, and Wang Ming, who Mao viewed as enemies. The persecution of Zhou Enlai distressed Moscow, and Georgi Dimitrov wrote a personal letter to Mao indicating that "Zhou Enlai... must not be severed from the Party." In the end, Zhou's enthusiastic acknowledgement of his own faults, his praise for Mao's leadership, and his attacks on Mao's enemies eventually convinced Mao that Zhou's conversion to Maoism was genuine, a precondition for Zhou's political survival. By the seventh congress of the CCP in 1945, Mao was acknowledged as the overall leader of the CCP, and the dogma of Mao Zedong Thought was firmly entrenched among the Party's leadership.

== Diplomatic efforts with the United States ==
=== The Dixie mission ===
As United States began to plan for an invasion of Japan, which at that point they assumed would be based in China, American political and military leaders became eager to make contact with the Communists. In June 1944, Chiang Kai-shek reluctantly agreed to allow an American military observation group, known as the "Dixie mission", to travel to Yan'an. Mao and Zhou welcomed this mission and held numerous talks in the interests of gaining American aid. They pledged support for any future American military actions to attack the Japanese in China, and attempted to convince the Americans that the CCP was committed to a united KMT-CCP government. In a gesture of goodwill, communist guerrilla units were instructed to rescue downed American airmen. By the time the Americans left Yan'an, many had become convinced that the CCP was "a party seeking orderly democratic growth toward socialism", and the mission formally suggested greater cooperation between the CCP and the American military.

=== 1944–1945 ===
In 1944, Zhou wrote to General Joseph Stilwell, the American commander of the China Burma India Theater of World War II, attempting to convince Stilwell of the need for the Americans to supply the Communists, and of the Communist's desire for a united Chinese government after the war. Stilwell's open disenchantment with the Nationalist government in general, and with Chiang Kai-shek specifically, motivated President Franklin D. Roosevelt to remove him that same year, before Zhou's diplomacy could be effective. Stilwell's replacement, Patrick J. Hurley, was receptive to Zhou's appeals, but ultimately refused to align the American military with the CCP unless the Party made concessions to the KMT, which Mao and Zhou found unacceptable. Soon after Japan surrendered in 1945, Chiang invited Mao and Zhou to Chongqing to take part in an American-endorsed peace conference.

=== The Chongqing negotiations ===
There was widespread apprehension in Yan'an that the invitation from Chiang was a trap, and that the Nationalists were planning to assassinate or imprison the two instead. Zhou took control over Mao's security detail, and his subsequent inspections of their plane and lodgings found nothing. Throughout the trip to Chongqing, Mao refused to enter his accommodations until they had been personally inspected by Zhou. Mao and Zhou traveled together to receptions, banquets, and other public gatherings, and Zhou introduced him to numerous local celebrities and statesmen that he had befriended during his earlier stay in Chongqing.

During the forty-three days of negotiations, Mao and Chiang met eleven times to discuss the conditions of post-war China, while Zhou worked on confirming the details of the negotiations. In the end, the negotiations resolved nothing. Zhou's offer to withdraw the Red Army from southern China was ignored, and P.J. Hurley's ultimatum to incorporate the CCP into the KMT insulted Mao. After Mao returned to Yan'an on 10 October 1945, Zhou stayed behind to sort out the details of the conference's resolution. Zhou returned to Yan'an on 27 November 1945, when major skirmishes between the Communists and Nationalists made future negotiations pointless. Hurley himself subsequently announced his resignation, accusing members of the US embassy of undermining him and favoring the Communists.

=== The Marshall negotiations ===
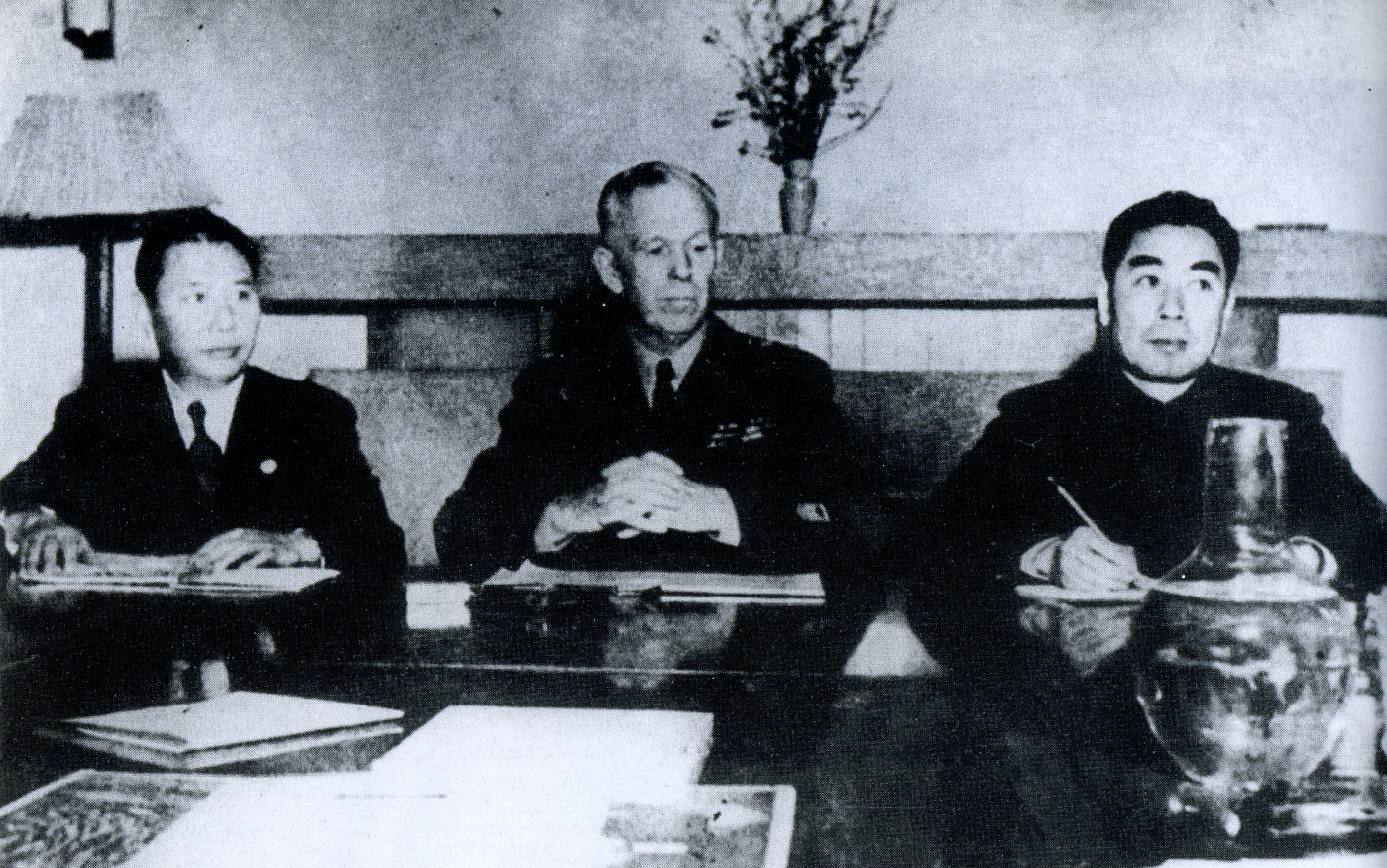
The Marshall Mission (1946), left to right: Zhang Qun, George C. Marshall, Zhou Enlai

After Harry S. Truman became President of the United States, he nominated General George C. Marshall as his special envoy to China on 15 December 1945. Marshall was charged with brokering a ceasefire between the CCP and KMT, and to influence both Mao and Chiang to abide by the Chongqing agreement, which both had signed. The top leadership within the CCP, including Zhou, viewed Marshall's nomination as a positive development, and hoped that Marshall would be a more flexible negotiator than Hurley had been. Zhou arrived in Chongqing to negotiate with Marshall on 22 December.

The first phase of talks went smoothly. Zhou represented the Communists, Marshall represented the Americans, and Zhang Qun (later replaced by Zhang Zhizhong) represented the KMT. In January 1946 both sides agreed to cease hostilities, and to reorganize their armies on the principle of separating the army from political parties. Zhou signed these agreements in the knowledge that neither side would be able to implement these changes. Chiang delivered a speech promising political freedom, local autonomy, free elections, and the release of political prisoners. Zhou welcomed Chiang's statements and expressed his opposition to civil war.

The leadership of the CCP viewed these agreements optimistically. On 27 January 1946 the CCP Secretariat appointed Zhou as one of eight leaders to participate in a future coalition government (other leaders included Mao, Liu Shaoqi, and Zhu De). It was suggested that Zhou be nominated as China's vice president. Mao expressed a desire to visit the United States, and Zhou received orders to manipulate Marshall in order to advance the peace process.

Marshall's negotiations soon deteriorated, as neither the KMT nor the CCP were willing to sacrifice any of the advantages that they had gained, to depoliticize their armies, or to sacrifice any degree of autonomy in areas their side controlled. Military clashes in Manchuria became increasingly frequent in the spring and summer of 1946, eventually forcing Communist forces to retreat after a few major battles. Government armies increased their attacks in other parts of China.

On 3 May 1946, Zhou and his wife left Chongqing for Nanjing, where the Nationalist capital returned. Negotiations deteriorated, and on 9 October Zhou informed Marshall that he no longer had the confidence of the CCP. On 11 October Nationalist troops seized the Communist city of Zhangjiakou in northern China. Chiang, confident in his ability to defeat the Communists, called the National Assembly into session without the participation of the CCP and ordered it to draft a constitution on 15 November. On 16 November Zhou held a press conference, in which he condemned the KMT for "tearing up the agreements from the political consultative conference". On 19 November Zhou and the entire CCP delegation left Nanjing for Yan'an.

== Resumption of Civil War ==
=== Military strategist and intelligence chief ===
Following the failure of negotiations, the Chinese Civil War resumed in earnest. Zhou turned his focus from diplomatic to military affairs, while retaining a senior interest in intelligence work. Zhou worked directly under Mao as his chief aide, as the vice chairman of the Military Commission of the Central Committee, and as the general chief of staff. As the head of the Urban Work Committee of the Central Committee, an agency established to coordinate work inside KMT-controlled areas, Zhou continued to direct underground activities.

A superior force of Nationalist troops captured Yan'an in March 1947, but Zhou's intelligence agents (primarily Xiong Xianghui) provided Yan'an's commanding general, Peng Dehuai, with details of the KMT army's troop strength, distribution, positions, air cover, and dates of deployment. This intelligence allowed Communist forces to avoid major battles and to engage Nationalist forces in a protracted campaign of guerrilla warfare that eventually led to Peng achieving a series of major victories. By February 1948 over half the KMT troops in the northwest were either defeated or exhausted. By January 1949, Communist forces seized Beijing and Tianjin and were firmly in control of north China.

=== Diplomacy ===
On 21 January 1949, Chiang stepped down as president of the Nationalist government and was succeeded by General Li Zongren. On 1 April 1949, Li began a series of peace negotiations with a six-member CCP delegation. The CCP delegates were led by Zhou Enlai, and the KMT delegates were led by Zhang Zhizhong.

Zhou began the negotiations by asking: "Why did you go to Xikou (where Chiang had retired) to see Chiang Kai-shek before leaving Nanjing?" Zhang responded that Chiang still had power, even though he had technically retired, and that his consent would be needed to finalize any agreement. Zhou responded that the CCP would not accept a bogus peace dictated by Chiang and asked whether Zhang had come with the necessary credentials to implement the terms desired by the CCP. Negotiations continued until 15 April, when Zhou produced a "final version" of a "draft agreement for internal peace", which was essentially an ultimatum to accept CCP demands. The KMT government did not respond after five days, signaling that it was not prepared to accept Zhou's demands.

On 21 April, Mao and Zhou issued an "order to the army for country-wide advance". PLA troops captured Nanjing on 23 April and captured Li's stronghold of Guangdong in October, forcing Li to go into exile in America. In December 1949, PLA troops captured Chengdu, the last KMT-controlled city on mainland China, forcing Chiang to evacuate to Taiwan.

== PRC diplomat and statesman ==
=== Diplomatic situation of the PRC in 1949 ===
Following the establishment of the People's Republic of China (PRC) on 1 October 1949, Zhou was appointed both Premier of the Government Administration Council (later replaced by the State Council) and Minister of Foreign Affairs. Through the coordination of these two offices and his position as a member of the five-man standing committee of the Politburo, Zhou became the architect of early PRC foreign policy, presenting China as a new, yet responsible member of the international community. Zhou was an experienced negotiator and was respected as a senior revolutionary within China. Zhou's inclusion of non-Communists in his cabinet was notable, with 47% of his ministers and half of his commissioners having no Communist affiliation.

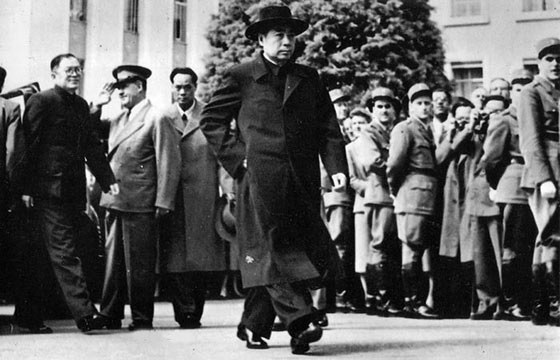
Zhou at Geneva, 26 April 1954

By the early 1950s, China's international influence was extremely low. By the end of the Qing Dynasty in 1911, China's pretensions of universalism had been shattered by a string of military defeats and incursions by Europeans and Japanese. By the end of Yuan Shikai's reign and the subsequent Warlord Era, China's international prestige had declined to "almost nothing". In World War II, China's effective role was sometimes questioned by other Allied leaders. The 1950–1953 Korean War greatly exacerbated China's international position by fixing the United States in a position of animosity, ensuring that Taiwan would remain outside of PRC control and that the PRC would remain outside of the United Nations for the foreseeable future.

Zhou's earliest efforts to improve the prestige of the PRC involved recruiting prominent Chinese politicians, capitalists, intellectuals, and military leaders who were not technically affiliated with the CCP. Zhou convinced Zhang Zhizhong to accept a position inside the PRC in 1949, after Zhou's underground network successfully escorted Zhang's family to Beijing. All of the other members of the KMT delegation that Zhou had negotiated with in 1949 accepted similar terms.

Sun Yat-sen's widow, Soong Ching-ling, who was estranged from her family and who had opposed the KMT for many years, readily joined the PRC in 1949. Huang Yanpei, a prominent industrialist who had refused offers of a government post for many years, was persuaded to accept a position as vice premier in the new government. Fu Zuoyi, the KMT commander who had surrendered the Beijing garrison in 1948, was persuaded to join the PLA, and to accept a position as the minister of water conservation.

Zhou was a major figure in developing science and technology policy in the early PRC.

=== Diplomacy with India ===
Zhou's first diplomatic successes came as the result of successfully pursuing a warm relationship, based on mutual respect, with India's first post-independence prime minister, Jawaharlal Nehru. Through his diplomacy, Zhou managed to persuade India to accept China's occupation of Tibet in 1950 and 1951. India was later persuaded to act as a neutral mediator between China and the United States during the many difficult phases of the negotiations settling the Korean War. Zhou helped to negotiate the 1954 Sino-Indian Agreement and later formalized some of its components as the Five Principles of Peaceful Coexistence, a central concept in Chinese foreign policy.

During the 1962 Sino-Indian border conflict, Zhou ordered the withdrawal of the victorious Chinese forces to 10 kilometers behind the McMahon Line, the return of all captured weapons and equipment, and the burial of the Indian dead with full military honors. This decision was controversial within the PLA, but it pleased Mao. Zhou's "extraordinary magnanimity" provoked a split in the Indian military and government, weakening them and deterring further conflict with China.

=== The Korean War ===
When the Korean War broke out on 25 June 1950, Zhou was in the process of demobilizing half of the PLA's 5.6 million soldiers, under the direction of the Central Committee. Zhou and Mao discussed the possibility of American intervention with Kim Il Sung in May and urged Kim to be cautious if he was to invade and conquer South Korea, but Kim refused to take these warnings seriously. On 28 June 1950, after the United States pushed through a UN resolution condemning North Korean aggression and sent the Seventh Fleet to "neutralize" the Taiwan Strait, Zhou criticized both the UN and US initiatives as "armed aggression on Chinese territory."

Although Kim's early success led him to predict that he would win the war by the end of August, Zhou and other Chinese leaders were more pessimistic. Zhou did not share Kim's confidence that the war would end quickly and became increasingly apprehensive that the United States would intervene. To counter the possibility of an American invasion into North Korea or China, Zhou secured a Soviet commitment to have the USSR support Chinese forces with air cover and deployed 260,000 Chinese soldiers along the North Korean border, under the command of Gao Gang, but they were strictly ordered not to move into North Korea or engage UN or USA forces unless they engaged themselves. Zhou commanded Chai Chengwen to conduct a topographical survey of Korea, and directed Lei Yingfu, Zhou's military advisor in North Korea, to analyze the military situation there. Lei concluded that MacArthur would most likely attempt a landing at Incheon.

On 15 September 1950 MacArthur landed at Incheon, met little resistance, and captured Seoul on 25 September. Bombing raids destroyed most North Korean tanks and much of its artillery. North Korean troops, instead of withdrawing north, rapidly disintegrated. On 30 September, Zhou warned the United States that "the Chinese people will not tolerate foreign aggression, nor will they supinely tolerate seeing their neighbors being savagely invaded by imperialists."

On 1 October, on the first anniversary of the PRC, South Korean troops crossed the Thirty-Eighth Parallel into North Korea. Stalin refused to become directly involved in the war, and Kim sent a frantic appeal to Mao to reinforce his army. On 2 October, the Chinese leadership continued an emergency meeting at Zhongnanhai to discuss whether China should send military aid, and these talks continued until 6 October. At the meeting, Zhou was one of the few firm supporters of Mao's position that China should send military aid, regardless of the strength of American forces. With the endorsement of Peng Dehuai, the meeting concluded with a resolution to send military forces to Korea.

In order to enlist Stalin's support, Zhou traveled to Stalin's summer resort on the Black Sea on 10 October. Stalin initially agreed to send military equipment and ammunition, but warned Zhou that the USSR's air force would need two or three months to prepare any operations and no ground troops were to be sent. In a subsequent meeting, Stalin told Zhou that he would only provide China with equipment on a credit basis, and that the Soviet air force would only operate over Chinese airspace after an undisclosed period of time. Stalin did not agree to send either military equipment or air support until March 1951.

Immediately on his return to Beijing on 18 October 1950, Zhou met with Mao Zedong, Peng Dehuai, and Gao Gang, and the group ordered the 200,000 Chinese troops along the border to enter North Korea, which they did on 25 October. After consulting with Stalin, on 13 November, Mao appointed Zhou the overall commander of the People's Volunteer Army, a special unit of the People's Liberation Army, China's armed forces that would intervene in the Korean War and coordinator of the war effort, with Peng as field commander of the PVA. Orders given by Zhou to the PVA were delivered in the name of the Central Military Commission.

By June 1951, the war had reached a stalemate around the Thirty-eighth Parallel, and the two sides agreed to negotiate an armistice. Zhou directed the truce talks, which began on 10 July. Zhou chose Li Kenong and Qiao Guanhua to head the Chinese negotiating team. The negotiations proceeded for two years before reaching a ceasefire agreement in July 1953, formally signed at Panmunjom.

The Korean War was Zhou's last military assignment. In 1952, Peng Dehuai succeeded Zhou in managing the Central Military Commission (which Zhou had headed since 1947). In 1956, after the eighth Party Congress, Zhou formally relinquished his post in the Military Commission and focused on his work in the Standing Committee, the State Council, and on foreign affairs.

=== Diplomacy with China's communist neighbors ===
After Stalin died on 5 March 1953, Zhou left for Moscow and attended Stalin's funeral four days later. Mao, curiously, decided not to travel to Moscow, possibly because no senior Soviet politician had yet traveled to Beijing, or because Stalin had rejected an offer to meet with Mao in 1948 (nevertheless, a huge memorial service in honor of Stalin was held in Beijing's Tiananmen Square with Mao and hundreds of thousands more in attendance). While in Moscow, Zhou was notably received with considerable respect by Soviet officials, being permitted to stand with the USSR's new leaders—Vyacheslav Molotov, Nikita Khrushchev, Georgy Malenkov, and Lavrentiy Beria—instead of with the other "foreign" dignitaries who attended. With these four leaders, Zhou walked directly behind the gun carriage bearing Stalin's coffin. Zhou's diplomatic efforts on his travel to Moscow were rewarded shortly after when, in 1954, Khrushchev himself visited Beijing to take part in the fifth anniversary of the founding of the People's Republic. Because Malenkov, Stalin's successor for the time being, was insecure in his position, Zhou renegotiated some Sino-Soviet agreements on more favorable terms for China and begin negotiations on new economic and technological exchange agreements. Most notably, Zhou pushed for the transfer of Soviet nuclear technology to China.

Throughout the 1950s, Zhou worked to tighten economic and political relations between China and other Communist states, coordinating China's foreign policy with Soviet policies promoting solidarity among political allies. In 1952, Zhou signed an economic and cultural agreement with the Mongolian People's Republic, giving de facto recognition of the independence of what had been known as "Outer Mongolia" in Qing times. Zhou also worked to conclude an agreement with Kim Il Sung in order to help the postwar reconstruction of North Korea's economy. Pursuing the goals of peaceful diplomacy with China's neighbor, Zhou held amicable talks with Myanmar's prime minister, U Nu, and promoted China's efforts to send supplies to Ho Chi Minh's Vietnamese rebels known as the Vietminh.

=== The Geneva Conference ===
In April 1954, Zhou traveled to Switzerland to attend the Geneva Conference, convened to settle issues left over from the Korean War, and the ongoing First Indochina War. The negotiations on Korea produced no result, but Zhou's patience and shrewdness were credited with assisting the major powers involved (the Soviets, French, Chinese, North Vietnamese, and British) to iron out the agreement ending Indochina War. According to the negotiated peace, French Indochina was to be partitioned into Laos, Cambodia, North Vietnam, and South Vietnam. Elections were agreed to be called within two years to create a government in a united Vietnam, and the Vietminh agreed to end their guerilla activities in South Vietnam, Laos, and Cambodia.

During one early meeting in Geneva, Zhou found himself in the same room with the staunchly anticommunist American secretary of state, John Foster Dulles. After Zhou politely offered to shake his hand, Dulles rudely turned his back and walked out of the room, saying "I cannot." Zhou was interpreted by onlookers as turning this moment of possible humiliation into a small victory by giving only a small, "Gallic-style" shrug to this behavior. Zhou was equally effective in countering Dulles' insistence that China not be given a seat at the sessions. Furthering the impression of Chinese urbanity and civility, Zhou had lunch with British actor Charlie Chaplin, who had been living in Switzerland since being blacklisted in the United States for his alleged socialist politics.

=== The Asian–African Conference ===
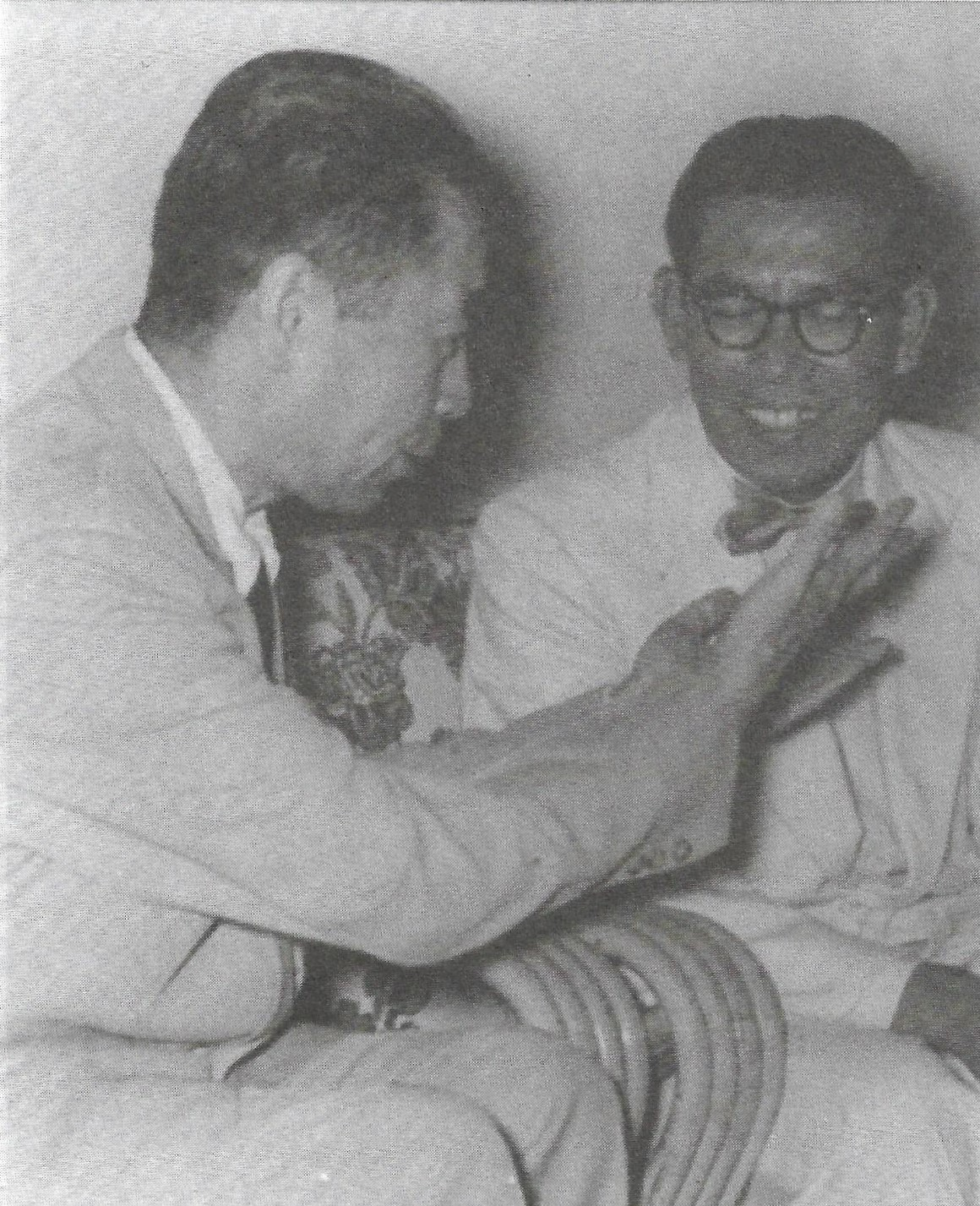
Zhou Enlai and Sanusi Hardjadinata, the chairman of the Bandung Conference.

In 1955, Zhou was a prominent participant in the Asian–African Conference held in Indonesia. The conference in Bandung was a meeting of twenty-nine African and Asian states, organized by Indonesia, Myanmar, Pakistan, Sri Lanka, and India, and was called largely to promote Afro-Asian economic and cultural cooperation and to oppose colonialism or neocolonialism by either the United States or the Soviet Union in the Cold War. At the conference, Zhou skillfully gave the conference a neutral stance that made the United States appear as a serious threat to the peace and stability of the region. Zhou complained that, while China was working toward "world peace and the progress of mankind", "aggressive circles" within the United States were actively aiding the Nationalists in Taiwan and planning to rearm the Japanese. He was widely quoted for his remark that "the population of Asia will never forget that the first atom bomb was exploded on Asian soil." With the support of its most prestigious participants, the conference produced a strong declaration in favor of peace, the abolition of nuclear arms, general arms reduction, and the principle of universal representation at the United Nations.

On his way to the Bandung conference, an assassination attempt was made against Zhou when a bomb was planted on the Air India plane Kashmir Princess, chartered for Zhou's trip from Hong Kong to Jakarta. Zhou avoided the attempt when he changed planes at the last minute, but all 11 of the flight's other passengers were killed, with only three crew members surviving the crash. A recent study has blamed the attempt on "one of the intelligence agencies of the KMT." Journalist Joseph Trento has also alleged that there was a second attempt on Zhou's life at the Bandung conference involving "a bowl of rice poisoned with a slow-acting toxin."

According to one account based on recent research, Zhou found out about the bomb on the Kashmir Princess after being warned of the plot by his own intelligence officers and did not attempt to stop it because he viewed those that died as disposable: international journalists and low-level cadres. After the crash, Zhou used the incident to warn the British about the KMT intelligence operatives active in Hong Kong and pressured Great Britain to disable the Nationalist intelligence network operating there (with himself playing a support role). He hoped that the incident would improve Britain's relationship with the PRC, and damage Britain's relationship with the ROC. The official explanation for Zhou's absence on the flight, however, remains that Zhou was forced to change his schedule due to having had surgery for appendicitis.

After the Bandung conference, China's international political situation began to gradually improve. With the help of many of the nonaligned powers who had taken part in the conference, the US-backed position economically and politically boycotting the PRC began to erode, despite continuing American pressure to follow its direction. In 1971 the PRC gained China's seat at the United Nations.

=== Tour of Africa ===
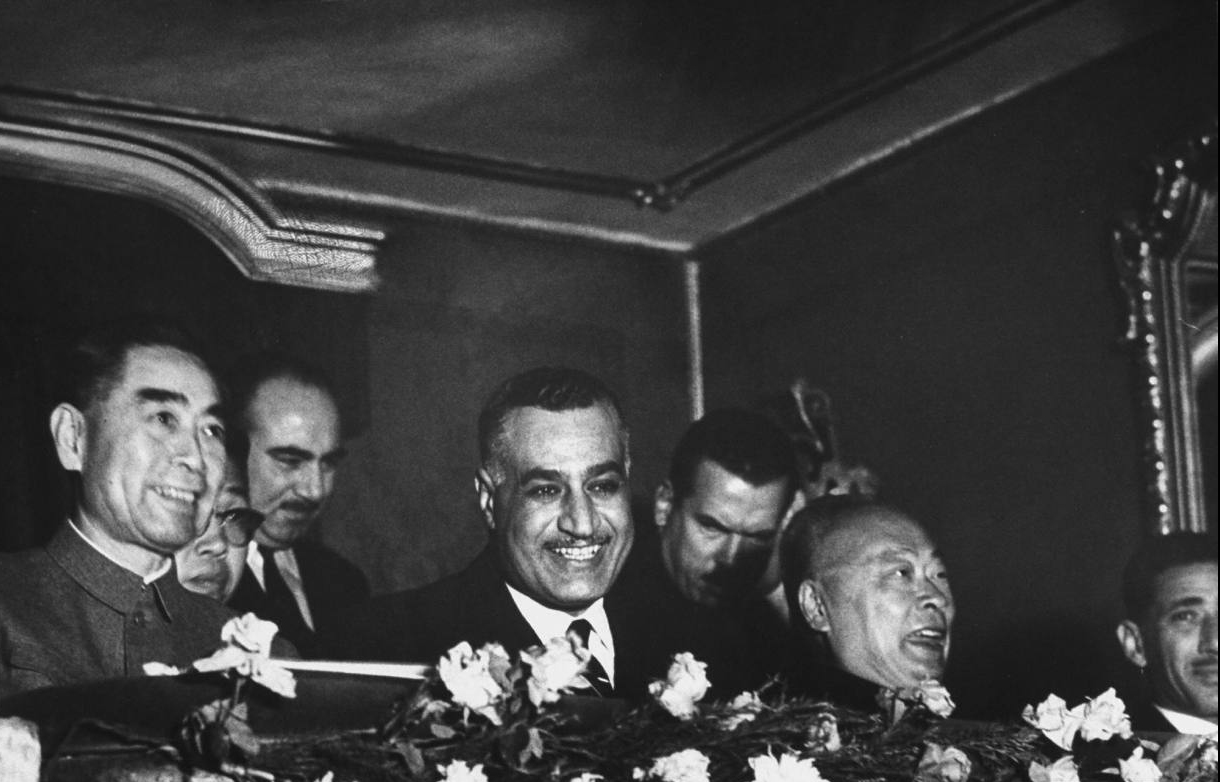
Zhou Enlai (left) during his tour of Egypt, with President Gamal Abdel Nasser of Egypt, December 1963

From December 1963 until January 1964, Zhou made diplomatic visitations to all of the North African countries. On 15 December, Zhou met with President Nasser of Egypt in an effort to further relations between the countries. Then, on 21 December, Zhou visited Algeria. At their meeting, President Ahmed Ben Bella asked for a peaceful coexistence between the two nations. On 27 December, the Tunisian government announced it intended to recognize the Chinese Communist Government after planning with the Tunisian ambassador to have Zhou visit the country for 2 days in January. On 28 December, Zhou visited Morocco and met with King Hasan II. While unconfirmed, it is believed this meeting was more economic in nature, rather than attempting to garner support for communist China.

It is also said he planned on meeting with leaders in Mali, Guinea, and Ghana.

=== Position on Taiwan and ROC ===
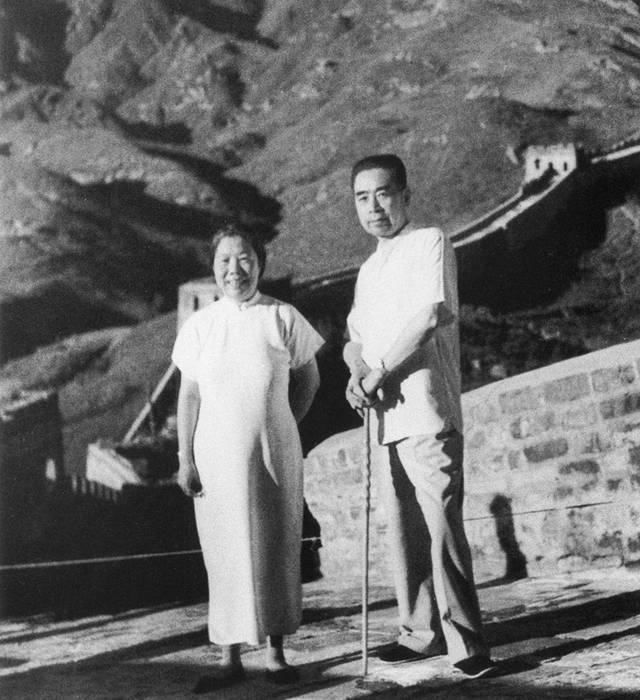
Zhou and his wife Deng at the Badaling section of the Great Wall of China (1955)

When the PRC was founded on 1 October 1949, Zhou notified all governments that any countries wishing to have diplomatic contact with the PRC must end their relationship with the leaders of the former ROC regime on Taiwan, and support the PRC's claim to China's seat in the United Nations. This was the first foreign policy document issued by the new government. By 1950, the PRC gained diplomatic relationships with other communist countries and with thirteen non-communist countries, but talks with most Western governments were unsuccessful.

Zhou emerged from the Bandung conference with a reputation as a flexible and open-minded negotiator. Recognizing that the United States would back the de facto independence of ROC-controlled Taiwan with military force, Zhou persuaded his government to end the shelling of Kinmen and Matsu, and to search for a diplomatic alternative to the confrontation instead. In a formal announcement in May 1955, Zhou declared that the PRC would "strive for the liberation of Taiwan by peaceful means so far as it is possible." Whenever the question of Taiwan was raised with foreign statesmen, Zhou argued that Taiwan was part of China, and that the resolution of the conflict with the Taiwan authorities was an internal matter.

In 1958 the post of Minister of Foreign Affairs was passed to Chen Yi, a general with little prior diplomatic experience. After Zhou resigned his office in Foreign Affairs, the PRC diplomatic corps was reduced dramatically. Some of the staff were transferred to various cultural and educational departments to replace leading cadres who had been labeled "rightists" and sent to work in labor camps.

=== The Shanghai communique ===
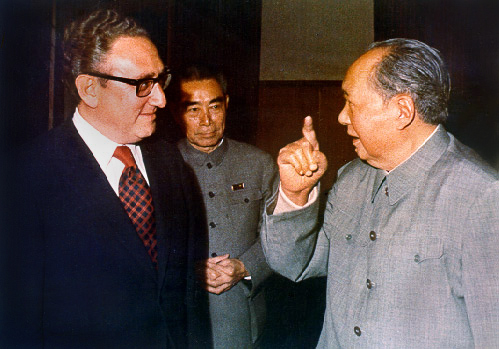
Zhou, shown here with Henry Kissinger and Mao Zedong

Zhou shakes hands with President Richard Nixon upon Nixon's arrival in China in February 1972.

By the early 1970s, Sino-American relations had begun to improve. Mao's workers in the petroleum industry, one of China's few growing economic sectors at the time, advised the chairman that, in order to consider growth at levels desired by the Party's leadership, large imports of American technology and technical expertise were essential. In January 1970, the Chinese invited the American ping-pong team to tour China, initiating an era of "ping-pong diplomacy".

In 1971, Zhou Enlai met secretly with President Nixon's security advisor, Henry Kissinger, who had flown to China to prepare for a meeting between Richard Nixon and Mao Zedong. During the course of these meetings, the United States agreed to allow the transfer of American money to China (presumably from relatives in the United States), to allow American-owned ships to conduct trade with China (under foreign flags), and to allow Chinese exports into the United States for the first time since the Korean War. At the time, these negotiations were considered so sensitive that they were concealed from the American public, the State Department, the American secretary of state, and all foreign governments.

On the morning of 21 February 1972, Richard Nixon arrived in Beijing, where he was greeted by Zhou, and later met with Mao Zedong. The diplomatic substance of Nixon's visit was resolved on 28 February, in the Shanghai Communiqué, which summarized both sides' positions without attempting to resolve them. The "US side" reaffirmed the American position that America's involvement in the ongoing Vietnam War did not constitute "outside intervention" in Vietnam's affairs, and restated its commitment to "individual freedom", and pledged continued support for South Korea. The "Chinese Side" stated that "wherever there is oppression, there is resistance", that "all foreign troops should be withdrawn to their own countries", and that Korea should be unified according to the demands of North Korea. Both sides agreed to disagree on the status of Taiwan. The closing sections of the Shanghai Communique encouraged further diplomatic, cultural, economic, journalistic, and scientific exchanges, and endorsed both sides' intentions to work toward "the relaxation of tensions in Asia and the world." The resolutions of the Shanghai Communique represented a major policy shift for both the United States and China.

== The Great Leap Forward ==
Zhou (center) and Zhang Zhongliang, then Chairman of Gansu Province (second from left) inspecting the Lanzhou Oil Refinery, October 14, 1959

During the Sufan movement, Zhou tried to protect members of institutions he controlled, like the Academy of Sciences, by limiting the severity of the accusations made against them. However, he was not able to protect all of his allies. For example, Zhou's associate from the civil war, Pan Hannian, fell under suspicion due to his contacts with forces opposed to the communists during that time and was arrested.In 1959, Zhou obtained Mao's permission to rehabilitate 40,000 "rightist" intellectuals.

In 1958, Mao Zedong began the Great Leap Forward, aimed at increasing China's production levels in industry and agriculture with unrealistic targets. As a popular and practical administrator, Zhou maintained his position through the Leap. In 1959, he had his family's graveyard in Huai An demolished so that the land could be used for collective farming. Colleagues and relatives of Zhou said that he did this to set an example of integrity during difficult times.

By the early 1960s, Mao's prestige was not as high as it had once been. Mao's economic policies in the 1950s had failed, and he had developed a lifestyle that was increasingly out of touch with many of his oldest colleagues. The combination of his personal eccentricities and industrialization policy failures produced criticism from such veteran revolutionaries as Liu Shaoqi, Deng Xiaoping, Chen Yun, and Zhou Enlai, who seemed less and less to share an enthusiasm for his vision of continuous revolutionary struggle.

== The Cultural Revolution ==
=== Initial efforts of Mao and Lin ===
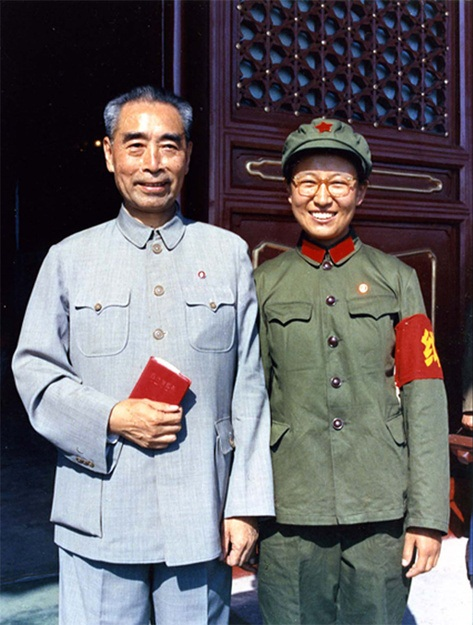
Zhou in 1966, the first year of the Cultural Revolution (with Li Na, daughter of Mao)

To improve his image and power, Mao, with the help of Lin Biao, undertook a number of public propaganda efforts. Among the efforts of Mao and Lin to improve Mao's image in the early 1960s were Lin's publication of the Diary of Lei Feng and his compilation of Quotations from Chairman Mao. The last and most successful of these efforts was the Cultural Revolution. At an initial planning session of the Party Central Committee, Zhou debated the proposed sixteen point program for the Cultural Revolution, leading to the alteration of at least ten of the points. While still in political favor, Zhou focused his efforts on the protection of scientists, academics, cultural workers, writers, and artists. He ultimately was unable to protect the officials in most of the institutions under his control, but had some success protecting his friends and allies such as Nie Rongzhen and Guo Moruo.

Whatever its other causes, the Cultural Revolution, declared in 1966, was overtly pro-Maoist, and gave Mao the power and influence to purge the Party of his political enemies at the highest levels of government. Along with closing China's schools and universities, it exhorted of young Chinese to destroy old buildings, temples, and art, and to attack their "revisionist" teachers, school administrators, party leaders, and parents. After the Cultural Revolution was announced, many of the most senior members of the CCP who had shared Zhou's hesitation in following Mao's direction, including President Liu Shaoqi and Deng Xiaoping, were removed from their posts almost immediately; they, along with their families, were subjected to mass criticism and humiliation.

=== Political survival ===
Soon after they had been removed, Zhou argued that President Liu Shaoqi and Deng Xiaoping "should be allowed to come back to work", but this was opposed by Mao, Lin Biao, Kang Sheng, and Chen Boda. Chen Boda even suggested that Zhou himself might be "considered counter-revolutionary" if he did not toe the Maoist line. Following the threats that he would share in the fate of his comrades if he did not support Mao, Zhou ceased his criticisms and began to work more closely with the chairman and his clique.

Zhou gave his backing to the establishment of radical Red Guard organizations in October 1966 and joined Chen Boda and Jiang Qing against what they considered "leftist" and "rightist" Red Guard factions. This opened the way for attacks on Liu Shaoqi, Deng Xiaoping, and Tao Zhu in December 1966 and January 1967. By September 1968, Zhou candidly described his strategy for political survival to Japanese LDP parliamentarians visiting Beijing: "one's personal opinions should advance or beat a retreat according to the direction of the majority." When he was accused of being less than enthusiastic in following Mao's leadership, he accused himself of "poor understanding" of Mao's theories, giving the appearance of compromising with forces that he secretly loathed and referred to in private as his "inferno". Following the logic of political survival, Zhou worked to aid Mao, and restricted his criticisms to private conversations.

Throughout the next decade, Mao largely developed policies while Zhou carried them out, attempting to moderate some of the excesses of the Cultural Revolution, such as preventing Beijing from being renamed "East Is Red City" (Chinese: 东方红市; pinyin: Dōngfānghóngshì) and the Chinese guardian lions in front of Tiananmen Square from being replaced with statues of Mao. Using Mao's authority, Zhou drew up lists of people to be protected from persecution, including Puyi and his family, the National Peoples Congress Standing Committee, the heads of the non-Communist parties, the judges of the Supreme Court and former Nationalist generals such as Cai Tingkai and Fu Tsoyi. He also protected some people who were in more serious danger of persecution by having them hospitalized at 301 Hospital, where sympathetic staff could keep them out of reach of the Red Guards. Zhou also ordered a PLA battalion to guard the Forbidden City and protect its traditional artifacts from vandalism and destruction by Red Guards. Zhou detested the yangbanxi. Despite his best efforts, the inability to prevent many of the events of the Cultural Revolution were a great blow to Zhou. Over the last decade of his life, Zhou's ability to implement Mao's policies and keep the nation afloat during periods of adversity was so great that his practical importance alone was sufficient to save him (with Mao's assistance) whenever Zhou became politically threatened. At the latest stages of the Cultural Revolution, in 1975, Zhou pushed for the "Four Modernizations" in order to undo the damage caused by Mao's policies.

Although Zhou initially escaped direct persecution, he was not able to save many of those closest to him from having their lives destroyed by the Cultural Revolution. Sun Weishi, Zhou's adopted daughter, died in 1968 after seven months of torture, imprisonment, and rape by Maoist Red Guards. In 1968, Jiang also had his adopted son (Sun Yang) tortured and murdered by Red Guards. After the end of the Cultural Revolution, Sun's plays were re-staged as a way of criticizing the Gang of Four, whom many thought were responsible for her death.

During the later stages of the Cultural Revolution, Zhou became a target of political campaigns orchestrated by Chairman Mao and the Gang of Four. The "Criticize Lin, Criticize Confucius" campaign of 1973 and 1974 was directed at Premier Zhou because he was viewed as one of the Gang's primary political opponents. In 1975, Zhou's enemies initiated a campaign named "Criticizing Song Jiang, Evaluating the Water Margin", which encouraged the use of Zhou as an example of a political loser.

== Death ==
=== Illness and death ===
According to a biography of Zhou by Gao Wenqian, a former researcher at the CPC's Party Documents Research Office, Zhou was first diagnosed with bladder cancer in November 1972. Zhou's medical team reported that with treatment, he had a high chance of recovery; however, medical treatment for the highest-ranking party members had to be approved by Mao. Mao allegedly ordered that Zhou and his wife should not be told of the diagnosis, no surgery should be performed, and no further examinations should be given.

According to Ji Chaozhu, Zhou Enlai's personal interpreter, Henry Kissinger offered to send cancer specialists from the United States to treat Zhou, but that offer was eventually refused. By 1974, Zhou was experiencing significant bleeding in his urine. After pressure by other Chinese leaders who had learned of Zhou's condition, Mao finally ordered a surgical operation to be performed in June 1974, but the bleeding returned a few months later, indicating metastasis of the cancer into other organs. A series of operations over the next year and a half failed to check the progress of the cancer. Zhou continued to conduct work during his stays in the hospital, with Deng Xiaoping, as the First Deputy Premier, handling most of the important State Council matters. His last major public appearance was at the first meeting of the 4th National People's Congress on 13 January 1975, where he presented the government's work report. He then fell out of the public eye for more medical treatment. Zhou Enlai died from cancer at 09:57 on 8 January 1976, aged 77.

=== Mao's response ===
After Zhou's death, Mao issued no statements acknowledging Zhou's achievements or contributions and sent no condolences to Zhou's widow, herself a senior Party leader. Mao forbade his staff from wearing black mourning armbands. Whether or not Mao would have attended Zhou's funeral, which was held in the Great Hall of the People, remains in question as Mao himself was in very poor health and unable to do so in any event. Mao did, however, have a wreath sent to the funeral.

Mao attacked a proposal to have Zhou publicly declared a great Marxist, and rejected a request that he make a brief appearance at Zhou's funeral, instructing his nephew, Mao Yuanxin, to explain that he could not attend because doing so would be seen as a public admission that he was being forced to "rethink the Cultural Revolution", as Zhou's later years had been closely associated with reversing and moderating its excesses. Mao worried that public expressions of mourning would later be directed against him and his policies and backed the "five nos" campaign (see below) to suppress public expressions of mourning for Zhou after the late Premier's death.

=== Memorial ===
Whatever Mao's opinion of Zhou may have been, there was general mourning among the public. Foreign correspondents reported that Beijing, shortly after Zhou's death, looked like a ghost town. There was no burial ceremony, as Zhou had willed his ashes to be scattered across the hills and rivers of his hometown, rather than stored in a ceremonial mausoleum. With Zhou gone, it became clear how the Chinese people had revered him, and how they had viewed him as a symbol of stability in an otherwise chaotic period of history. Zhou's death also brought condolences from nations around the world.

Vice-Premier Deng Xiaoping delivered the eulogy at Zhou's state funeral on 15 January 1976. Although much of his speech echoed the wording of an official statement by the Central Committee immediately following Zhou's death or consisted of a meticulous description of Zhou's remarkable political career, near the end of the eulogy he offered a personal tribute to Zhou's character, speaking from the heart while observing the rhetoric demanded of ceremonial state occasions. Referring to Zhou, Deng stated that:

He was open and aboveboard, paid attention to the interests of the whole, observed Party discipline, was strict in "dissecting" himself and good at uniting the mass of cadres, and upheld the unity and solidarity of the Party. He maintained broad and close ties with the masses and showed boundless warmheartedness toward all comrades and the people.... We should learn from his fine style – being modest and prudent, unassuming, and approachable, setting an example by his conduct, and living in a plain and hard-working way. We should follow his example of adhering to the proletarian style and opposing the bourgeois style of life

Spence believed this statement was interpreted at the time as a subtle criticism of Mao and the other leaders of the Cultural Revolution, who could not possibly be viewed or praised as being "open and aboveboard", "good at uniting the mass of cadres", for displaying "warmheartedness", or for modesty, prudence, or approachability. Regardless of Deng's intentions, the Gang of Four, and later Hua Guofeng, increased the persecution of Deng shortly after he delivered this eulogy.

=== Suppression of public mourning ===
After Zhou's single official memorial ceremony on 15 January, Zhou's political enemies within the Party officially prohibited any further displays of public mourning. The most notorious regulations prohibiting Zhou from being honored were the poorly observed and poorly enforced "five nos": no wearing black armbands, no mourning wreaths, no mourning halls, no memorial activities, and no handing out photos of Zhou. Years of resentment over the Cultural Revolution, the public persecution of Deng Xiaoping (who was strongly associated with Zhou in public perception), and the prohibition against publicly mourning Zhou became associated with each other shortly after Zhou's death, leading to popular discontent against Mao and his apparent successors (notably Hua Guofeng and the Gang of Four).

Official attempts to enforce the "five nos" included removing public memorials and tearing down posters commemorating his achievements. On 25 March 1976, a leading Shanghai newspaper, Wenhui Bao, published an article stating that Zhou was "the capitalist roader inside the Party [who] wanted to help the unrepentant capitalist roader [Deng] regain his power". This and other propaganda efforts to attack Zhou's image only strengthened the public's attachment to Zhou's memory. Between March and April 1976, a forged document circulated in Nanjing that claimed itself to be Zhou Enlai's last will. It attacked Jiang Qing and praised Deng Xiaoping and was met with increased propaganda efforts by the government.

=== The Tiananmen incident ===
Within several months after the death of Zhou, one of the most extraordinary spontaneous events in the history of the PRC occurred. On 4 April 1976, at the eve of China's annual Qingming Festival, in which Chinese traditionally pay homage to their deceased ancestors, thousands of people gathered around the Monument to the People's Heroes in Tiananmen Square to commemorate the life and death of Zhou Enlai. On this occasion, the people of Beijing honored Zhou by laying wreaths, banners, poems, placards, and flowers at the foot of the Monument. The most obvious purpose of this memorial was to eulogize Zhou, but Jiang Qing, Zhang Chunqiao, and Yao Wenyuan were also attacked for their alleged evil actions against the Premier. A small number of slogans left at Tiananmen even attacked Mao himself, and his Cultural Revolution.

Up to two million people may have visited Tiananmen Square on 4 April. First-hand observations of the events in Tiananmen Square on 4 April report that all levels of society, from the poorest peasants to high-ranking PLA officers and the children of high-ranking cadres, were represented in the activities. Those who participated were motivated by a mixture of anger over the treatment of Zhou, revolt against Mao and his policies, apprehension for China's future, and defiance of those who would seek to punish the public for commemorating Zhou's memory. There is nothing to suggest that events were coordinated from any position of leadership: it was a spontaneous demonstration reflecting widespread public sentiment. Deng Xiaoping was notably absent, and he instructed his children to avoid being seen at the square.

On the morning of 5 April, crowds gathering around the memorial arrived to discover that it had been completely removed by the police during the night, angering them. Attempts to suppress the mourners led to a violent riot, in which police cars were set on fire and a crowd of over 100,000 people forced its way into several government buildings surrounding the square.

By 6:00 pm, most of the crowd had dispersed, but a small group remained until 10:00 pm, when a security force entered Tiananmen Square and arrested them. (The reported figure of those arrested was 388 people but was rumored to be far higher.) Many of those arrested were later sentenced to "people's trial" at Peking University or were sentenced to prison work camps. Incidents similar to those which occurred in Beijing on 4 and 5 April occurred in Zhengzhou, Kunming, Taiyuan, Changchun, Shanghai, Wuhan, and Guangzhou. Possibly because of his close association with Zhou, Deng Xiaoping was formally stripped of all positions "inside and outside the Party" on 7 April, following this "Tiananmen Incident".

After ousting Hua Guofeng and assuming control of China in 1980, Deng Xiaoping released those arrested in the Tiananmen Incident as part of a broader effort to reverse the effects of the Cultural Revolution.

== Legacy ==
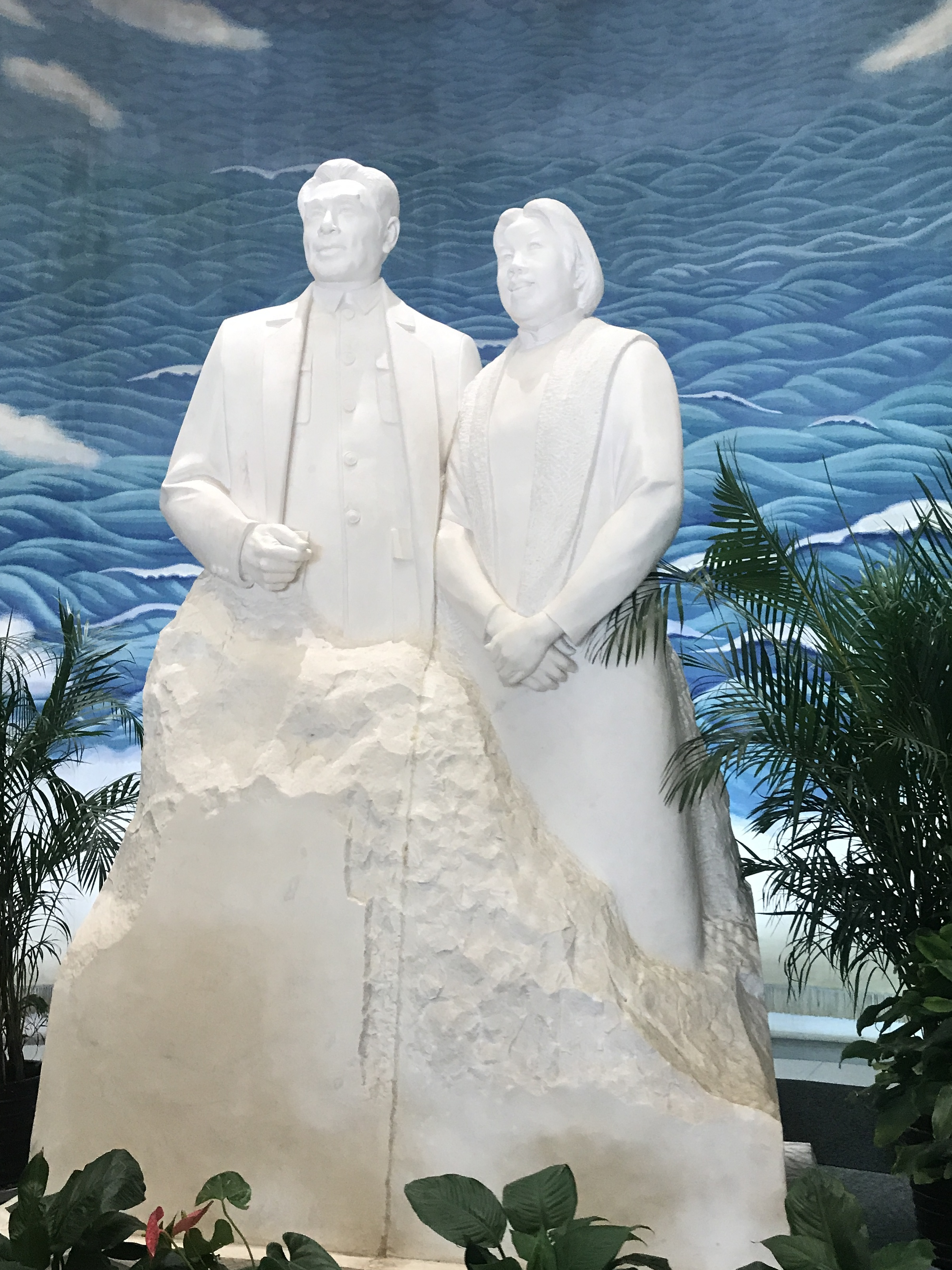
Statue of Zhou and Deng in the Memorial to Zhou Enlai and Deng Yingchao in Tianjin.

By the end of his lifetime, Zhou was widely viewed as representing moderation and justice in China. Since his death, Zhou has been regarded as a skilled negotiator fluent in foreign languages, a master of policy implementation, a devoted revolutionary, and a pragmatic statesman with an unusual attentiveness to detail and nuance. He was also known for his tireless and dedicated work ethic, and his unusual charm and poise in public. Zhou's political behavior should be viewed in light of his political philosophy as well as his personality. To a large extent, Zhou epitomized the paradox inherent in a Communist politician with traditional Chinese upbringing: at once conservative and radical, pragmatic and ideological, possessed of a belief in order and harmony as well as a faith, which he developed very gradually over time, in the progressive power of rebellion and revolution.

Though a firm believer in the Communist ideal on which the People's Republic was founded, Zhou is widely credited to have moderated the excesses of Mao's radical policies within the limits of his power. It has been assumed that he successfully protected several imperial and religious sites of cultural significance (such as the Potala Palace in Lhasa and Forbidden City in Beijing) from the Red Guards, and shielded many top-level leaders, including Deng Xiaoping, as well as many officials, academics, and artists, from purges. Deng Xiaoping was quoted as saying Zhou was "sometimes forced to act against his conscience in order to minimize the damage" stemming from Mao's policies.

While many earlier Chinese leaders today have been subjected to criticism inside China, Zhou's image has remained positive and respected among contemporary Chinese. Many Chinese continue to venerate Zhou as possibly the most humane leader of the 20th century, and the CPC today promotes Zhou as a dedicated and self-sacrificing leader who remains a symbol of the Communist Party. Even historians who list Mao's faults generally attribute the opposite qualities to Zhou: Zhou was cultured and educated whereas Mao was crude and simple; Zhou was consistent whereas Mao was unstable; Zhou was stoic whereas Mao was paranoid. Following the death of Mao, Chinese press emphasized in particular his consultative, logical, realistic, and cool-headed leadership style.

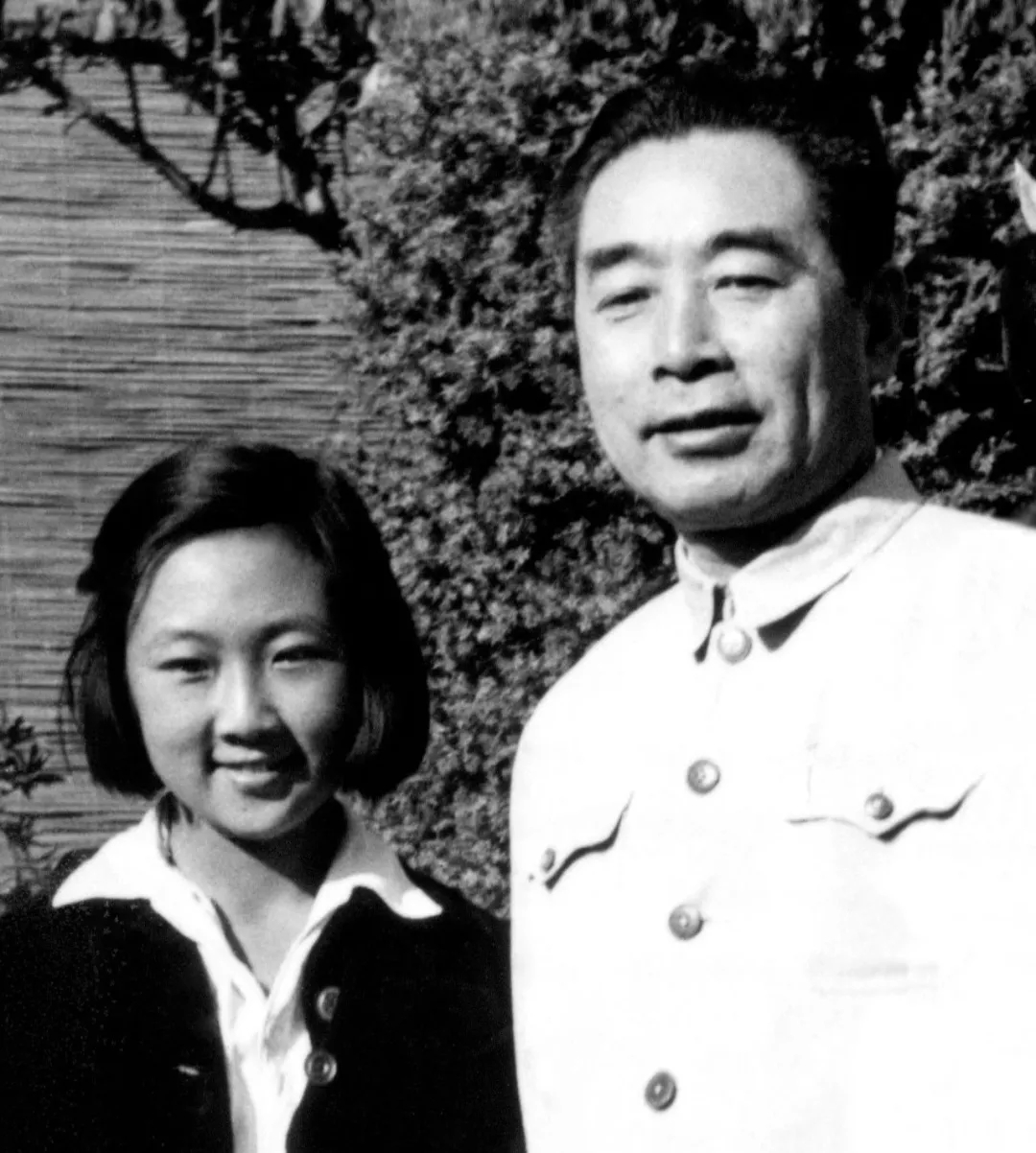
Zhou with his niece Zhou Bingde

However, recent academic criticism of Zhou has focused on his late relationship with Mao, and his political activities during the Cultural Revolution, arguing that the relationship between Zhou and Mao may have been more complex than is commonly portrayed. Zhou has been depicted as unconditionally submissive and extremely loyal to Mao and his allies, going out of his way to support or permit the persecution of friends and relatives in order to avoid facing political condemnation himself. After the founding of the PRC, Zhou was unable or unwilling to protect the former spies that he had employed in the Chinese Civil War and the Second World War, who were persecuted for their wartime contacts with the enemies of the CCP. Early in the Cultural Revolution, he told Jiang Qing "From now on you make all the decisions, and I'll make sure they're carried out", and publicly declared that his old comrade, Liu Shaoqi, "deserved to die" for opposing Mao. In the effort to avoid being persecuted for opposing Mao, Zhou passively accepted the political persecution of many others, including his own brother Zhou Enshou.

Zhou's survival of successive purges tends to suggest that he was a political opportunist. Li Zhisui, then one of Mao's personal physicians, characterized Zhou as such and was severely critical of Zhou in his book The Private Life of Chairman Mao, describing him as "Mao's slave, absolutely obsequiously obedient... Everything he did, he did to be loyal to Mao. Neither he nor [Deng Yingchao] had a shred of independent thought". Li also described Mao's contradictory relationship with Zhou as one where he demanded total loyalty, "but because Zhou was so subservient and loyal, Mao held [Zhou] in contempt". Some observers have criticized him as being too diplomatic: avoiding clear stands in complex political situations and instead becoming ideologically elusive, ambiguous, and enigmatic. Several explanations have been offered to explain his elusiveness. Dick Wilson, the former chief editor of the Far Eastern Economic Review, writes that Zhou's only option "was to go on pretending to support the [Cultural Revolution] movement, while endeavoring to deflect its successes, blunt its mischief, and stanch the wounds it was inflicting." This explanation for Zhou's elusiveness was also widely accepted by many Chinese after his death. Wilson also writes that Zhou "would have been hounded out of his position of influence, removed from control of the Government" were he to "make a stand and demand that Mao call off the campaign or bring the Red Guards to heel."

Given the political circumstances of the last decade of Zhou's life, it is unlikely that he would have survived a purge without cultivating the support of Mao through active assistance. Zhou's role in the Cultural Revolution is thus defended by many on the grounds that he had no choice other than political martyrdom. Deng Xiaoping, in the Party's internal resolution on the Cultural Revolution, remarked that: "If not for the Premier, the outcome of the Cultural Revolution might have been worse." On the other hand, "if not for the Premier, the Cultural Revolution might not have dragged on for so long."

Zhou was a major influence on environmental protection in China; Chinese histories of environmentalism often describe Zhou as the "father" of environmental protection in China.

Zhou received a great deal of praise from American statesmen who met him in 1971. Henry Kissinger wrote that he had been extremely impressed with Zhou's intelligence and character, describing him as "equally at home in philosophy, reminiscence, historical analysis, tactical probes, humorous repartee... [and] could display an extraordinary personal graciousness." Kissinger called Zhou "one of the two or three most impressive men I have ever met", stating that "his commands of facts, in particular his knowledge of American events and, for that matter, of my own background, was stunning." In his memoirs, Richard Nixon stated that he was impressed with Zhou's exceptional "brilliance and dynamism".

"Mao dominated any gathering; Zhou suffused it. Mao's passion strove to overwhelm opposition; Zhou's intellect would seek to persuade or outmaneuver it. Mao was sardonic; Zhou penetrating. Mao thought of himself as a philosopher; Zhou saw his role as an administrator or a negotiator. Mao was eager to accelerate history; Zhou was content to exploit its currents."

— Former U.S. Secretary of State Henry Kissinger, On China (2011)

After coming to power, Deng Xiaoping may have overemphasized Zhou Enlai's achievements to distance the Communist Party from Mao's Great Leap Forward and Cultural Revolution, both of which had seriously weakened the Party's prestige. Deng observed that Mao's disastrous policies could no longer represent the Party's finest hour, but that the legacy and character of Zhou Enlai could. Furthermore, Deng received credit for enacting successful economic policies that Zhou initially proposed. By actively associating itself with an already popular Zhou Enlai, Zhou's legacy may have been used (and possibly distorted) as a political tool of the Party after his death.

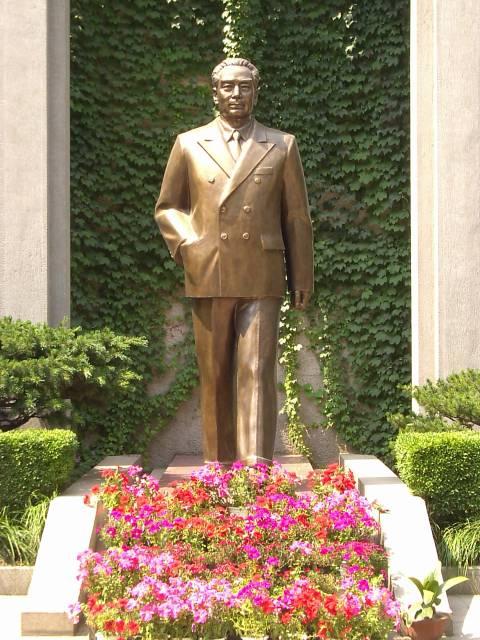
A bronze statue of Zhou in Nanjing

Zhou remains a widely commemorated figure in China today. After the founding of the People's Republic of China, Zhou ordered his hometown of Huai'an not to transform his house into a memorial and not to keep up the Zhou family tombs. These orders were respected within Zhou's lifetime, but today his family home and traditional family school have been restored, and are visited by a large number of tourists every year. In 1998, Huai'an, in order to commemorate Zhou's one hundredth birthday, opened a vast commemorative park with a museum dedicated to his life. The park includes a reproduction of Xihuating, Zhou's living and working quarters in Beijing.

The city of Tianjin has established a museum to Zhou and his wife Deng Yingchao, and the city of Nanjing has erected a memorial commemorating Communist negotiations in 1946 with the Nationalist government which features a bronze statue of Zhou. Stamps commemorating the first anniversary of Zhou's death were issued in 1977, and in 1998 to commemorate his 100th birthday.

The 2013 historical drama film The Story of Zhou Enlai features the trip of Zhou Enlai in May 1961 during the Great Leap Forward, when he investigated the rural situation in Huaxi of Guiyang and a former revolutionary base Boyan Township of Hebei.

== In popular culture ==
Chinese actor Sun Weimin has frequently portrayed Zhou on screen, including in films The Founding of a Republic (2009) and Mao Zedong 1949 (2019), and the television series Diplomatic Situation (2019), among others.

Two rock songs refer to Zhou. In their 1969 song "How-Hi-the-Li", composed by bassist Ric Grech, Family, in a satire of political figures, ask "if Mr. Chou En-Lai, he gets high / With all the tea in China." Zhou is one of many world figures mentioned in Billy Joel's 1989 song "We Didn't Start the Fire".

== Awards and honors ==
- Cambodia:
  - Grand Cross of the Royal Order of Cambodia (1956)
- Indonesia:
  - Star of the Republic of Indonesia, 2nd Class (1961)
- Poland:
  - Grand Cross of the Order of Polonia Restituta (1954)

== Works ==
- Zhou Enlai (1981). Selected Works of Zhou Enlai. Vol. I (1st ed.). Beijing: Foreign Languages Press. ISBN 0-8351-2251-4. Archived from the original on 25 February 2020.
- — (1989). Selected Works of Zhou Enlai. Vol. II (1st ed.). Beijing: Foreign Languages Press. ISBN 0-8351-2251-4. Archived from the original on 25 February 2020.

== See also ==
- Former Residence of Zhou Enlai (Huai'an)
- Former Residence of Zhou Enlai (Shanghai)
- History of the Chinese Communist Party
- History of the People's Republic of China

== Notes ==
Government offices
New title	Premier of China; 1949–1976	Succeeded by Hua Guofeng
New title	Minister of Foreign Affairs; 1949–1958	Succeeded by Chen Yi
Political offices
Preceded by Mao Zedong	Chairman of the National Committee of the Chinese People's Political Consultative Conference; 1954–1976	Vacant Death of Zhou Enlai Title next held by Deng Xiaoping from 1978
Party political offices
Preceded by Wang Ming	Head of the CPC Central United Front Department; 1947–1948	Succeeded by Li Weihan
New title	Vice Chairman of the Chinese Communist Party; 1956–1966; Served alongside: Chen Yun, Liu Shaoqi, Zhu De, Lin Biao	Succeeded by Lin Biao
Preceded by Lin Biao; Vacant since 1971	Vice Chairman of the Chinese Communist Party; 1973–1976; Served alongside: Kang Sheng, Li Desheng, Wang Hongwen, Ye Jianying, Deng Xiaoping	Succeeded by Hua Guofeng; Wang Hongwen; Ye Jianying; Deng Xiaoping
