= 10th National Congress of the Chinese Communist Party =

1973 Chinese Communist Party conference

10th National Congress of the Chinese Communist Party 中国共产党第十次全国代表大会
- The flag of the Chinese Communist Party before 1996
- Begins: August 24, 1973
- Ends: August 28, 1973
- Locations: Great Hall of the People, Beijing, China
- Previous event: 9th National Congress of the Chinese Communist Party (1969)
- Next event: 11th National Congress of the Chinese Communist Party (1977)
- Participants: 1,249 delegates
- Major events: Election of the 10th Central Committee
- Leader: Mao Zedong (Leader of the Chinese Communist Party)

10th National Congress of the Chinese Communist Party
- Traditional Chinese: 中國共產黨第十次全國代表大會
- Simplified Chinese: 中国共产党第十次全国代表大会
Transcriptions
Standard Mandarin
- Hanyu Pinyin: Zhōngguó Gòngchǎndǎng Dìshícì Quánguó Dàibiǎo Dàhuì

Abbreviated name
- Chinese: 十大
Transcriptions
Standard Mandarin
- Hanyu Pinyin: Shí-dà

The 10th National Congress of the Chinese Communist Party was held in the Great Hall of the People, Beijing, between August 24 and 28, 1973. 1,249 delegates represented the party's estimated 28 million members. It was preceded by the 9th National Congress and was succeeded by the 11th National Congress.

The Congress was a significant moment, held following the fall of Lin Biao and the amidst continuation of the Cultural Revolution. It elected the 10th Central Committee of the Chinese Communist Party.

== Details of the Congress ==
On 20 August 1973, prior to the start of the congress, the Politburo of the Chinese Communist Party adopted a resolution to suspend the party memberships of Lin Biao, Ye Qun, Huang Yongsheng, Wu Faxian, Li Zuopeng and Qiu Huizuo indefinitely.

The congress was opened on 24 August, with Mao Zedong presiding over its opening session, Zhou Enlai delivering the political report and Wang Hongwen reporting regarding the revision of the Constitution. Mao and Zhou suggested the political rehabilitation of 13 old guard members such as Tan Zhenlin and Li Jingquan.

The 10th Congress affirmed the revised Constitution of the Chinese Communist Party that was also adopted by the 9th national congress. It stipulated some adjustments in the structure but the provisions of the section is not much changed, such as the guiding ideology and the basic principles of the party. In the edited bill, only discussions and doctrines proposed or related to Lin Biao were removed.

The 10th congress elected 195 Central Committee members and 124 alternate members, with the Gang of Four taking key roles within the central committee and the rehabilitation of politicians persecuted during the Cultural Revolution, which included Li Zuopeng, Deng Xiaoping, Wang Jiaxiang and others.

== Significance of the Congress ==
=== New power structure ===
The fall of Lin Biao and his cohorts in 1971 left many vacant posts in the party and the government. Of the 21-man Politburo only 10 were left and of its five-man Standing Committee, only three – Mao Zedong, Zhou Enlai and Kang Sheng – were still present. Therefore, the 10th congress convened to elect new members to those made vacant and to condemn the actions of Lin Biao as a right opportunist who "waved the red flag to defeat the red flag".

During the congress, the Gang of Four managed to secure positions with the support from Mao. Jiang Qing and Yao Wenyuan were elected to the Poliburo, Zhang Chunqiao to the Standing Committee and Wang Hongwen as the party's second vice-chairman.

=== Continuation of the Cultural Revolution ===
Wang Hongwen in his debut keynote address during the congress announced the smashing of the "two bourgeois headquarters, the one headed by Liu Shaoqi and the other by Lin Biao". Wang stressed the revolutionary spirit of daring to go against the tide and the importance of training young leaders. With the future of the country in the hands of the young, struggle and continuous revolution would punctuate Chinese political life.
