= Case of the Lin Biao and Jiang Qing Counter-Revolutionary Cliques =

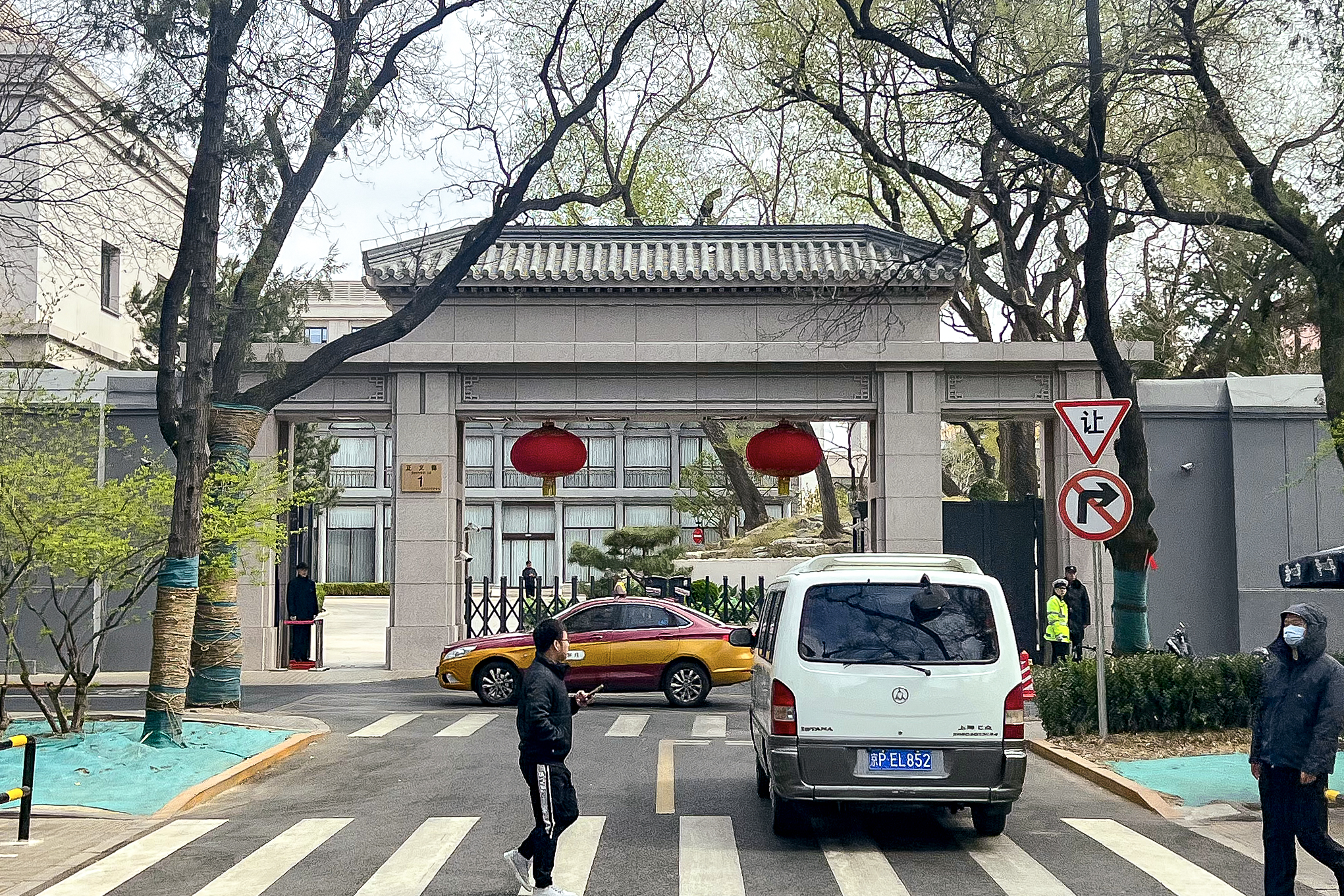
- The Special Court's headquarters (now the offices of the Central Commission for Discipline Inspection and the National Supervisory Commission)
- Date: November 20, 1980 – January 25, 1981
- Duration: 67 days
- Location: No. 1 Zhengyi Road, Dongcheng District, Beijing, China
- Accused: Huang Yongsheng, Wu Faxian, Li Zuopeng, Qiu Huizuo, Jiang Tengjiao, Jiang Qing, Zhang Chunqiao, Yao Wenyuan, Wang Hongwen, Chen Boda and Mao Yuanxin
- Convictions: Crime of organizing and leading a counter-revolutionary group Conspiracy to subvert the government Counter-revolutionary propaganda and incitement False accusation and framing Counter-revolutionary murder Counter-revolutionary assault Crime of actively participating in counter-revolutionary groups Intentional homicide Crime of instigating armed rebellion
- Sentence: Death sentence with reprieve, deprivation of political rights for life (Jiang Qing, Zhang Chunqiao); Life imprisonment, deprivation of political rights for life (Wang Hongwen); Other principal offenders were sentenced to prison terms ranging from twenty to sixteen years (except for Mao Yuanxin, all of whom were also deprived of their political rights for five years).

The Case of the Lin Biao and Jiang Qing Counter-Revolutionary Cliques was a criminal case in China after the end of the Cultural Revolution. The name of this case referred to two “counter-revolutionary” groups or “cliques” headed by Lin Biao and Jiang Qing, respectively, who "wanted to seize supreme power". The case implicated core members of the Jiang Qing clique, such as Zhang Chunqiao, Yao Wenyuan, Wang Hongwen, and Jiang Qing herself, all of whom were collectively known as the Gang of Four, as well as members of the Lin Biao Anti-Party Clique, such as Qiu Huizuo and Wu Faxian. Chen Boda, a former member of the Politburo Standing Committee, was also tried as a member of the Jiang Qing clique.

== Background ==
=== "Lin Biao Group" ===
- Lin Biao (deceased before trial)
- Ye Qun (deceased before trial)
- Lin Liguo (deceased before trial)
- Zhou Yuchi (deceased before trial)
- Xie Fuzhi (deceased before trial)
- Huang Yongsheng
- Wu Faxian
- Li Zuopeng
- Qiu Huizuo
- Jiang Tengjiao

=== "Jiang Qing Group" ===
- Jiang Qing
- Zhang Chunqiao
- Yao Wenyuan
- Wang Hongwen
- Chen Boda

=== Other involved parties ===
- "Principal offender": Kang Sheng (deceased before trial)
- Mao Yuanxin
- Kuai Dafu

== Trial preparation ==
Following the third plenary session of the 11th Central Committee of the Chinese Communist Party in 1978, Deng Xiaoping gradually became the paramount leader of China. Under his leadership, the government of China began legal trials and convictions of the two political groups headed by Jiang Qing and Lin Biao, respectively. It is noteworthy that the CCP intentionally categorized Zhang Chunqiao's political rival, Chen Boda, as part of the "Jiang Qing group" to avoid complicating the Lin Biao issue.

On 29 September 1980, the 16th meeting of the Standing Committee of the 5th National People's Congress adopted the Decision on Establishing the Special Procuratorate of the Supreme People's Procuratorate and the Special Court of the Supreme People's Court to Prosecute and Try the Principal Offenders in the Lin Biao and Jiang Qing Counter-Revolutionary Clique Case. Huang Huoqing, Procurator-General of the Supreme People's Procuratorate, was appointed concurrently as Director of the Special Procuratorate, and Jiang Hua, President of the Supreme People's Court, was appointed concurrently as Chief Judge of the Special Court. The Special Court consisted of two trial chambers. The decision stipulated that the Special Court would conduct open trials and that its judgments would be final.

The indictment issued by the Special Procuratorate of the Supreme People's Procuratorate of the People's Republic of China (Special Procuratorate No. 1) contains more than 20,000 words and names 10 defendants. It was made public before the trial. On 10 November 1980, the Special Court of the Supreme People's Court reviewed the indictment and decided to accept the case.

== Court proceedings ==
From 20 November 1980 to 25 January 1981, the Special Court of the Supreme People's Court held a public hearing on this case at No. 1 Zhengyi Road, Dongcheng District, Beijing (the former site of the Beijing Municipal Committee of the Chinese Communist Party and the former site of the Beijing Municipal Government's Reception Office). At 3:00 PM on 20 November 1980, the first hearing commenced. After Huang Huoqing, representing the prosecution, read the indictment, Judge Jiang Hua announced that the defendants in the Jiang Qing Group case—Jiang Qing, Zhang Chunqiao, Yao Wenyuan, Wang Hongwen, and Chen Boda—would be tried in the First Trial Court; and the defendants in the Lin Biao Group case—Huang Yongsheng, Wu Faxian, Li Zuopeng, Qiu Huizuo, and Jiang Tengjiao—would be tried in the Second Trial Court.

== Verdict ==
On the morning of 25 January 1981, the court pronounced its verdict, identifying all 10 defendants as key members of the Lin Biao and Jiang Qing counter-revolutionary clique, and sentencing them accordingly. In 1986, Mao Zedong's nephew, Mao Yuanxin, was tried and sentenced for participating in the Jiang Qing counter-revolutionary clique.

=== Ruling ===
==== The case of Liu Shaoqi being falsely accused, framed, and persecuted to death ====
"The Lin Biao and Jiang Qing counter-revolutionary clique conspired to frame and persecute Liu Shaoqi, the Chairman of the People's Republic of China."

- In August 1966, Lin Biao instructed Ye Qun to dictate the fabricated materials they had made to frame Liu Shaoqi to Lei Yingfu, the deputy director of the Operations Department of the General Staff, and instructed Lei Yingfu to write the materials to frame Liu Shaoqi.
- In December 1966, Zhang Chunqiao summoned Kuai Dafu, a student at Tsinghua University, and instructed him to organize a march and demonstration, first inciting the public to "overthrow Liu Shaoqi".
- Beginning in May 1967, Jiang Qing directly controlled the "Liu Shaoqi and Wang Guangmei Special Case Group," and together with Kang Sheng and Xie Fuzhi, directed the group to coerce confessions from those arrested and detained, fabricating false evidence to frame Liu Shaoqi as a "traitor," "spy," and " counter-revolutionary."
  - In 1967, in order to fabricate false evidence to persecute Liu Shaoqi, Jiang Qing decided to arrest and detain eleven people, including Yang Yichen, vice governor of Hebei Province (formerly an official of the Organization Department of the CCP Manchuria Provincial Committee), Yang Chengzuo, professor at Renmin University of China (formerly a professor at Fu Jen Catholic University and Wang Guangmei's teacher), Wang Guang'en, a resident of Tianjin (formerly an assistant manager at Fengtian Textile Factory), and Hao Miao, Liu Shaoqi's cook.
    - During Yang Chengzhuo's critical illness, Jiang Qing told the special investigators, "We must conduct a surprise interrogation and get what we want before Yang dies." Jiang Qing's decision led to the persecution and death of Yang Chengzhuo.
    - The special task force directed by Jiang Qing also led to the persecution and death of Wang Guang'en.
    - Jiang Qing, in collusion with Xie Fuzhi, instructed Zhang Chongyi, who was critically ill, to be interrogated multiple times, resulting in Zhang Chongyi dying just two hours after one of the interrogations.
    - Jiang Qing, together with Kang Sheng, Xie Fuzhi and others, instructed the special investigation team to coerce confessions from Ding Juequn, who had participated in the workers' movement with Liu Shaoqi in Wuhan in 1927, and Meng Yongqian, who was arrested at the same time as Liu Shaoqi in Shenyang in 1929, fabricating false evidence and framing Liu Shaoqi as a "traitor".
- In July 1967, Jiang Qing, together with Kang Sheng and Chen Boda, decided to persecute Liu Shaoqi, thus depriving him of his freedom of movement.

Due to false accusations made by Jiang Qing and others, Liu Shaoqi was imprisoned and persecuted to death.

=== Penalties ===
The main culprits in the Lin Biao and Jiang Qing counter-revolutionary clique case who were prosecuted and sentenced
| Name | Age at the time of sentencing | Office | Defender | Defense performance | Charges | Main punishment | Additional punishment: Deprivation of political rights | Release date | Time of death | Age of death |
|---|---|---|---|---|---|---|---|---|---|---|
| Jiang Qing | 67 | Deputy Head of the Central Cultural Revolution Group; Member of the 9th and 10th CCP Central Committee Political Bureau | Refused | Pleased not guilty, "fought for Mao Zedong" (self-proclaimed) and "disrupted court order" (according to the verdict). | 1. Crime of organizing or leading a counter-revolutionary group; 2. Conspiracy to subvert the government; 3. Crime of counter-revolutionary propaganda and incitement; 4. The crime of false accusation and framing | Death sentence with reprieve, commuted to life imprisonment in January 1983. | Lifelong | N/A | May 14, 1991 (suicide by overdose of sleeping pills) | 77 years old |
| Zhang Chunqiao | 63 | Deputy Head of the Central Cultural Revolution Group; Member of the Standing Committee of the 10th CCP Central Committee Political Bureau; Member of the 9th CCP Central Committee Political Bureau; Vice Premier of the 4th State Council; Director of the Shanghai Municipal Revolutionary Committee | Refused | "Did not answer the court's questions" (judgment). | 1. Crime of organizing or leading a counter-revolutionary group; 2. Conspiracy to subvert the government; 3. Crime of instigating armed rebellion; 4. Crime of counter-revolutionary propaganda and incitement; 5. False accusation and framing | Death sentence with reprieve, commuted to life imprisonment in January 1983, and further commuted to 18 years in December 1997. | Lifelong, reduced to 10 years in December 1997. | January 1998 (released on medical parole) | April 21, 2005 | 88 years old |
| Yao Wenyuan | 49 | Member of the Central Cultural Revolution Group; Member of the 9th and 10th Central Political Bureau; Vice Chairman of the Shanghai Municipal Revolutionary Committee | Han Xuezhang Zhang Zhong | "Described his criminal behavior as a mistake, and refused to admit that it was a crime" (judgment). | 1. Crime of organizing or leading a counter-revolutionary group; 2. Conspiracy to subvert the government; 3. Crime of counter-revolutionary propaganda and incitement; 4. The crime of false accusation and framing | 20 years | 5 years | October 5, 1996 | December 23, 2005 | 73 years old |
| Wang Hongwen | 46 | Vice Chairman of the 10th CCP Central Committee and deputy director of the Shanghai Revolutionary Committee | Refused | "Confessed to his crimes" (judgment) | 1. Crime of organizing or leading a counter-revolutionary group; 2. Conspiracy to subvert the government; 3. Crime of instigating armed rebellion; 4. Counter-revolutionary assault; 5. False accusation and framing | Life imprisonment | Lifelong | N/A | August 3, 1992 | 57 years old |
| Chen Boda | 76 | Head of the Central Cultural Revolution Group; Member of the Standing Committee of the Political Bureau of the 8th and 9th CCP Central Committee | Gan Yumu Fu Zhiren | "Confessed to some of his crimes" (judgment) | 1. Crime of actively participating in a counter-revolutionary group; 2. Conspiracy to subvert the government; 3. Crime of counter-revolutionary propaganda and incitement; 4. The crime of false accusation and framing | 18 years | 5 years | Unknown | September 20, 1989 | 85 years old |
| Huang Yongsheng | 70 | General of the General Staff of the People's Liberation Army | Refused | "Confessed to some of his crimes" (judgment) | 1. Crime of organizing or leading a counter-revolutionary group; 2. Conspiracy to subvert the government; 3. The crime of false accusation and framing | 18 years | 5 years | Unknown | April 26, 1983 | 73 years old |
| Wu Faxian | 65 | Lieutenant General, Deputy Chief of the General Staff of the People's Liberation Army and Commander of the Air Force | Mark Chang Zhou Hengyuan | "Confessed to his crimes and exposed the crimes of his accomplices" (judgment). In his memoirs, Wu Faxian stated that he was innocent. | 1. Crime of organizing or leading a counter-revolutionary group; 2. Conspiracy to subvert the government; 3. The crime of false accusation and framing | 17 years | 5 years | 1981 (released on medical parole) | October 17, 2004 | 89 years old |
| Li Zuopeng | 66 | Lieutenant General, Deputy Chief of the General Staff of the People's Liberation Army and First Political Commissar of the Navy | Zhang Sizhi Su Huiyu | "Confessed to his crimes" (judgment) | 1. Crime of organizing or leading a counter-revolutionary group; 2. Conspiracy to subvert the government; 3. The crime of false accusation and framing | 17 years | 5 years | Unknown | January 3, 2009 | 93 years old |
| Qiu Huizuo | 66 | Lieutenant General, Deputy Chief of the General Staff of the People's Liberation Army and Minister of the General Logistics Department of the People's Liberation Army | Refused | "Confessed to his own crimes and exposed the crimes of his accomplices" (judgment). | 1. Crime of organizing or leading a counter-revolutionary group; 2. Conspiracy to subvert the government; 3. The crime of false accusation and framing | 16 years | 5 years | Unknown | July 18, 2002 | 88 years old |
| Jiang Tengjiao | 61 | Major General, Political Commissar of the Nanjing Military Region Air Force | Wang Shunhua Zhou Kuizheng | "Confessed to his own crimes and exposed the crimes of his accomplices" (judgment). | 1. Crime of organizing or leading a counter-revolutionary group; 2. Crime of instigating armed rebellion; 3. Attempted counter-revolutionary murder | 18 years | 5 years | 1999 | May 8, 2009 | 90 years old |
| Mao Yuanxin | 41 | Liaison officer of the Political Bureau of the CCP Central Committee | Unknown | "Confessed to his crimes" | 1. Crime of actively participating in a counter-revolutionary group; 2. Crime of false accusation and framing; 3. Intentional homicide; 4. Crime of counter-revolutionary propaganda and incitement; 5. Crime of instigating armed rebellion | 17 years | / | 1989 (released on medical parole) | / | Not dead |

=== Other persons mentioned in the judgment ===
The judgements for "principal offenders" that were already dead before the trial.
| Portrait Name | throughout the year | Time of death | Location of death | cause of death | Original title | Group | Relationship with other principal offenders | Official conclusions and their sources | Official handling results |
|---|---|---|---|---|---|---|---|---|---|
| Lin Biao | 63 years old | September 13, 1971 | Outside Undur Khan, Khentii Province, Mongolia | plane crash | Marshal, Vice Chairman of the 8th and 9th CCP Central Committee and Minister of National Defense | Lin Biao Group | Ye Qun's husband, Lin Liguo's father | | |
| Leafy Group | 54 years old | September 13, 1971 | Outside Undur Khan, Khentii Province, Mongolia | plane crash | Members of the 9th CCP Central Committee Political Bureau | Lin Biao Group | Lin Biao's wife and Lin Liguo's mother | | |
| Lin Liguo | 26 years old | September 13, 1971 | Outside Undur Khan, Khentii Province, Mongolia | plane crash | Deputy Chief of the Operations Department of the Air Force Command | Lin Biao Group | Lin Biao and Ye Qun's son | | |
| Zhou Yuchi | 36 years old | September 13, 1971 | Huairou, Beijing | Shoot yourself to death | Deputy Director of the Air Force Command Office | Lin Biao Group | | | |
| Xie Fuzhi | 63 years old | March 26, 1972 | Beijing | cancer | 9th CCP Central Committee Political Bureau Member, Minister of Public Security, General | | | " Kang Sheng and Xie Fuzhi were both politically corrupt and committed serious crimes during the Cultural Revolution. They directly participated in the counter-revolutionary conspiracy of Lin Biao, Jiang Qing, and others to seize power." | The eulogy was revoked and he was expelled from the Party. |
| Yasuo | 77 years old | December 16, 1975 | Beijing | cancer | Advisor to the Central Cultural Revolution Group, Vice Chairman of the 10th CCP Central Committee | | | " Kang Sheng and Xie Fuzhi were both politically corrupt and committed serious crimes during the Cultural Revolution. They directly participated in the counter-revolutionary conspiracy of Lin Biao, Jiang Qing, and others to seize power." | The eulogy was revoked and he was expelled from the Party. |

=== Victims ===
==== Persecution to death ====
1. Chengzuo: Professor at Renmin University of China (formerly Professor at Fu Jen Catholic University, teacher of Wang Guangmei)
2. Guang'en: A resident of Tianjin (former assistant manager of Fengtian Textile Factory)
3. Chongyi: Professor at Hebei Beijing Normal College (formerly Professor at Fu Jen Catholic University, teacher of Wang Guangmei)
4. Shaoqi: Vice Chairman of the 8th CCP Central Committee, First Chairman of the Standing Committee of the National People's Congress, Second President of the People's Republic of China
5. Peng Dehuai: Marshal, former Commander of the First Field Army and Minister of National Defense. He was dismissed and placed under house arrest for opposing the Great Leap Forward. After the September 13 Incident, he was falsely accused by the Gang of Four of being a "Lin Biao's henchman" and subjected to investigation and persecution, ultimately leading to his death.
6. Tao Yong: Lieutenant General, former Deputy Commander of the 9th Army Corps and Commander of the East China Sea Fleet. He was found dead in a dry well in January 1967; the cause of death remains a mystery.
7. Zhu Lan: Tao Yong's wife, who was persecuted to death in September 1967.
8. He Long: Marshal, Vice Chairman of the Central Military Commission, and Director of the National Defense Industry Commission. During the Cultural Revolution, he was accused of preparing for the "February Coup" and was persecuted to death on June 9, 1969.

==== Other victims ====
- Lu Dingyi: Vice Premier of the State Council for the 2nd and 3rd terms
- Wang Guangmei: Liu Shaoqi 's wife.
- Hong Xuezhi: General, former Minister of Logistics.
- Deng Hua: General, former Vice Governor of Sichuan Province.
- Solution: Major General, Deputy Dean of the Logistics Academy.
- Xu Wenlie: Major General, former Deputy Secretary-General of the General Political Department, and Political Commissar of the 50th Army.
- Chen Pixian
- Bo Yibo
- Peng Zhen
- Yang Shangkun

==== Attempted murder target ====
- Mao Zedong: Chairman of the Central Committee of the Chinese Communist Party and Chairman of the Central Military Commission of the Chinese Communist Party

== Impact and Evaluation ==
In this trial, Chen Boda, who had a long-standing feud with Zhang Chunqiao and was identified by Mao Zedong as the "Lin-Chen anti-Party clique", was tried as the principal offender of the "Jiang Qing clique". Some scholars believe that this was another major miscarriage of justice.

Wu Faxian, the principal offender of the Lin Biao group, was threatened by the court. He recalled that:

On the morning of December 16, two more judges came to tell me that there would be a court debate on December 18. I could speak in court, which is permitted by law. However, I should note that I cannot overturn the issues in the indictment, otherwise I would be sentenced to a heavy sentence.

In addition, on December 12, 1980, Liao Mosha attended Jiang Qing 's fifth trial as a witness and testified that Jiang Qing, together with Kang Sheng, Xie Fuzhi and others, had committed the crime of framing and persecuting veteran cadres. In court, he stated: "...In early 1955, I was sick and staying in Beijing Hospital. Jiang Qing came to my ward and talked about the situation in Shanghai in the past. She talked about it with great interest for one or two hours. She knew exactly what kind of person I was. It can be seen that she deliberately framed me and created a miscarriage of justice. I was unjustly imprisoned for more than eight years and exiled to a labor camp for three years. I was criticized and struggled against hundreds of times. My body was subjected to torture. All my teeth were knocked out..." At that time, Jiang Qing repeatedly insulted Liao Mosha in court: "Bullshit!" "You don't need to lie. Didn't you have a share in Sanjia Village ?!" At that time, Huang Huoqing, the chief prosecutor of the Supreme People's Procuratorate, stopped Jiang Qing: "You are not allowed to speak!" Jiang Qing retorted: "Why? I have the right to defend myself and the right to expose you!" After the presiding judge repeatedly tried to stop Jiang Qing without success, he ordered her to be escorted out of the courtroom on the grounds that she disrupting court order.
