= Lin Biao Counter-Revolutionary Clique =

- Simplified Chinese: 林彪反革命集团
- Traditional Chinese: 林彪反革命集團
Transcriptions
Standard Mandarin
- Hanyu Pinyin: Lín Biāo Fǎngémìng Jítuán

Lin Biao Counter-Revolutionary Clique
- Simplified Chinese: 林彪反党集团
- Traditional Chinese: 林彪反黨集團
Transcriptions
Standard Mandarin
- Hanyu Pinyin: Lín Biāo Fǎndǎng Jítuán

The Lin Biao Counter-Revolutionary Clique or the Lin Biao Anti-Party Clique was the term used during the Cultural Revolution in China to refer to a "clique organization" following the Lin Biao incident. It was mainly composed of Lin Biao, Chen Boda, Ye Qun, Huang Yongsheng, Wu Faxian, Li Zuopeng, Qiu Huizuo, and Lin Liguo. The Chinese Communist Party accused it of colluding with the Jiang Qing Counter-Revolutionary Clique (also known as the Gang of Four) to seize supreme power in China during the Cultural Revolution.

== History ==
Since the plot to assassinate Mao Zedong failed, Lin Biao fled by plane on 13 September 1971. The plane crashed in Undurhaan, Mongolia. Other key members were also arrested, and the Lin Biao group was crushed.

During the Cultural Revolution, due to the Lin Biao incident, the Lin Biao anti-Party clique was described as "representing the interests of the overthrown landlords and bourgeoisie, and representing the desire of the overthrown reactionaries to overthrow the dictatorship of the proletariat and restore the dictatorship of the bourgeoisie".
