= Wang Hongwen =

Chinese politician and activist (1935–1992)

Wang Hongwen Wang Hung-wen
- 王洪文
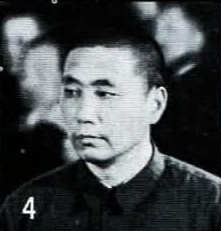
- Wang in 1980

Vice Chairman of the Chinese Communist Party
- In office 30 August 1973 – 6 October 1976
- Chairman: Mao Zedong; Hua Guofeng

Personal details
- Born: December 1935 Hsinking, Manchukuo (now Changchun, Jilin, China)
- Died: 3 August 1992 (aged 56) Beijing, China
- Party: Chinese Communist Party (1953–1976; expelled)
- Spouse: Cui Gendi (1958–1992)
- Children: 3 (2 sons and 1 daughter)

Military service
- Branch/service: People's Volunteer Army
- Years of service: 1950-1956
- Rank: Second Lieutenant
- Battles/wars: Korean War

Chinese name
- Chinese: 王洪文
Transcriptions
Standard Mandarin
- Hanyu Pinyin: Wáng Hóngwén
- Wade–Giles: Wang^{2} Hung^{2}-wen^{2}
- IPA: [wǎŋ xʊ̌ŋwə̌n]

Wang Hongwen (December 1935 – 3 August 1992), also romanised as Wang Hung-wen, was a Chinese politician and the youngest member of the Gang of Four. A former soldier and textile-mill security cadre, he rose to prominence during the Cultural Revolution (1966–1976) as a leader of Shanghai's rebel workers and an organiser of the Shanghai People's Commune, and went on to become one of the foremost national leaders of the Chinese Communist Party (CCP).

At the height of his power he was the second-ranking Vice Chairman of the CCP and third in the party's hierarchy, and he was widely seen as Mao Zedong's chosen successor. Mao later lost confidence in him over his alliance with Jiang Qing, Zhang Chunqiao and Yao Wenyuan. After Mao's death in 1976, Wang was arrested in an intra-party coup and expelled from the party, and in 1981 he was sentenced to life imprisonment. He died of liver cancer in 1992.

== Early life ==
Wang was born in December 1935 to a poor peasant family in Kaiyuan village, now part of Luyuan District of Changchun, Jilin province, at the time under the Japanese puppet state of Manchukuo. Some accounts, including that of the historian Li Xun, give his year of birth as 1934. He was the eldest of five children of Wang Guosheng and Wang Yangshi. Wang later recalled that at the age of two or three he nearly died of hunger, and that his father, believing him dead, left him in open country before carrying him home on finding that he was still alive. He had only about three months of education at a traditional private school and worked briefly as a pig herder in his early teens.

== Military career ==
In 1950, Wang enlisted in the army and was assigned to the 80th Division of the 27th Army, with which he entered the Korean War in 1951 as part of the People's Volunteer Army. He served first as a bodyguard and then as a signalman in the division's communications section. Perry and Li record that he also played the horn, while Li Xun notes that one contemporary remembered him playing the clarinet and that his wife recalled him playing the accordion and harmonica. Wang was barely literate when he enlisted. In Korea, when he asked someone to read him a letter from home, a bystander remarked that a man who refused to study did not deserve the help, and the rebuke spurred him to teach himself with a dictionary sent from China. According to Li Xun, he joined the Chinese Communist Party in June 1951.

In 1952, Wang's unit was moved to Wuxi, Jiangsu. In 1956, he attended a reserve officers' training course in Nanjing. In September 1956, he was demobilised as a reserve second lieutenant and assigned to the Shanghai No. 17 State Cotton Mill, a plant of about 8,000 workers in the Yangshupu industrial district of Shanghai.

== Political career ==
Wang started as a machine cleaner in the No. 4 spinning workshop and later became a maintenance worker and then the security head of the No. 2 workshop. In 1958, he won many votes in the re-election of his workshop's party branch, but was given only a part-time post as its propaganda member.

In March 1960, Wang was seconded to the mill's security section for militia work, and in July 1960 he was formally transferred there, which changed his status from worker to cadre. From September 1960, he spent about two years on a land reclamation project on Chongming Island, returning to the mill in December 1962 after an operation for appendicitis. Accounts compiled after the Cultural Revolution attributed to him sharp complaints about the famine of the early 1960s, including the remark that the disaster was man-made rather than natural. Li Xun cautions that such accounts were heavily shaped by the political language of the post-1976 period. Wang continued his studies at night school up to junior middle school level, and before the Cultural Revolution he earned 64 yuan a month.

=== Rebel leader in Shanghai ===
On 12 June 1966, Wang and six other workers put up a big-character poster beside the mill's clinic accusing the factory leadership of revisionism. Within an hour, the party secretary of the Shanghai cotton textile company arrived and called an emergency meeting of the mill's party committee, which disciplined Wang. He responded with a second poster that named more officials. A work team that entered the mill on 20 June backed him, but it was replaced on 20 July by a team from the Shanghai Municipal Party Committee that did not support his attack.

In October 1966, Wang put up another poster attacking the municipal work team and founded a rebel group named "Warriors Sworn to the Death to Carry the Cultural Revolution Through to the End". He then went to Beijing with fifteen of his followers to appeal to the central authorities, and on his return he won the admiration of other Shanghai rebels. This made him the leader of the Shanghai Workers' Revolutionary Rebel General Headquarters, which was founded in November. The sociologist Andrew G. Walder describes the headquarters as a federation of small cells of dissident workers, whose formation was helped by dissident middle-level factory personnel, most notably Wang.

On 8 November 1966, the headquarters demanded official recognition from the Shanghai Municipal Party Committee, which refused on the grounds that the demands contradicted the policy of the Central Cultural Revolution Group. After a rally of about 20,000 workers the next day, about 2,500 members seized a train bound for Beijing to complain to Mao Zedong, but the mayor, Cao Diqiu, had it stopped at the Anting siding outside the city on 10 November. More than half of the workers went home, but about 1,000 stayed put even after a telegram from Chen Boda ordered them back to work. Zhang Chunqiao was then sent to Shanghai, and on 13 November he formally signed the workers' demands at a rally in Culture Square, with the backing of the Central Cultural Revolution Group. Through this position Wang came into contact with Zhang and became involved with a Red Guards group.

In January 1967, the Workers' Headquarters became, together with the army and the public security forces, the main institutional base of Zhang's control over Shanghai after the seizure of power known as the January Storm. Wang helped organise the Shanghai People's Commune, which Zhang proclaimed on 5 February 1967, and the episode brought him national prominence as a daring rebel leader. Later that month, on Mao's advice, the commune was renamed the Shanghai Municipal Revolutionary Committee. Walder notes that the Workers' Headquarters, once a dissident mass organisation, was by then becoming an organisational arm of the revolutionary committee.

=== Rise to national leadership ===
At the 9th National Congress in April 1969, Wang was elected a member of the Central Committee. Following the Lin Biao incident in September 1971, he was put in charge of the investigation into the case in the Shanghai area, reporting directly to Mao. In September 1972, at Mao's suggestion, he was transferred to work in the central leadership. The New China News Agency first reported his presence in Beijing on 13 September 1972, listing him after the members of the Politburo.

At the 10th National Congress, Wang delivered the report on the revision of the party constitution on 24 August 1973. At the first plenary session of the new Central Committee on 30 August, he was elected to the Politburo Standing Committee and, at the age of 38, became the party's second-ranking vice chairman, behind Chairman Mao and Premier Zhou Enlai. The political scientist Parris Chang wrote in 1974 that his rapid rise had aroused a great deal of speculation. Time reported that some experts regarded his elevation as a token gesture, since he had no independent power base. Mao had high hopes for Wang. Between 12 September 1973 and 29 May 1974, he had Wang accompany him 16 times when receiving foreign heads of state and government, in order to raise his profile and give him political experience. For a time Mao also had him run the day-to-day work of the Central Committee. The writer Gu Baozi writes that Wang lacked the qualities the post required, and Shen Bi, writing in the People's Daily magazine Global People, says that he neglected reading and meetings in favour of luxuries and leisure.

Wang was associated with the radical leaders Jiang Qing and Yao Wenyuan. From mid-1973 to mid-1974, the radicals used the campaign to Criticize Lin, Criticize Confucius as an allegorical vehicle for attacking Zhou and his policies. On 17 July 1974, at a meeting of the Politburo, Mao first warned Wang, Jiang, Zhang and Yao against forming a small faction. On 4 September 1974, Wang was absent when Mao received the President of Togo Gnassingbé Eyadéma, and Deng Xiaoping took the seat beside Mao instead. Wang never again took part in receiving foreign guests.

On 23 December 1974, ahead of the 4th National People's Congress, Wang flew to Changsha to see Mao, in what Gu describes as an attempt to help the Gang of Four shape the new government. Mao criticised him and ordered him to stay for three days to write a self-criticism. Mao told Wang not to form a "Gang of Four", warning him that those who engaged in factionalism would come to grief. According to Gu, Mao lost faith in Wang after this meeting, which ended his standing as successor. Deng's power grew from the summer of 1974 through the late autumn of 1975, while Zhou was in hospital. Wang complained to the Shanghai leader Xu Jingxian that the State Council and the army now belonged to Deng, leaving him only the central study classes, and that this had been decided by Mao himself. Mao eventually placed his trust in Hua Guofeng as his successor.

In 1975, Wang became involved in the conflict between the authorities and the Hui Muslims of Shadian in Yunnan province. According to the official provincial gazetteer, in early July 1975 he met representatives of the Shadian Hui and warned them that their villages would be stormed if they continued to keep out the work teams and troops. The army's operation against Shadian and nearby villages, from 29 July to 18 August 1975, caused heavy casualties and destroyed most of the houses, in what became known as the Shadian incident.

== Downfall and arrest ==
After Mao's death on 9 September 1976, Wang was ranked second in the party hierarchy, behind Hua Guofeng. He presided over Mao's memorial service on 18 September 1976. According to the official Draft History of the People's Republic of China, on 11 September Wang set up a separate duty office of the party's General Office in Zhongnanhai and told the provinces to report important matters to it, which Hua and his allies saw as an attempt to cut them off from the provincial authorities. On 17 September, he flew to Shanghai to press ahead with arming the city's militia as a "second armed force". On 6 October 1976, Hua Guofeng and Ye Jianying called a meeting of the Politburo Standing Committee in Zhongnanhai's Huairen Hall, ostensibly to discuss the fifth volume of Mao's Selected Works, and summoned the members of the Gang of Four. Accounts of what happened when Wang arrived differ.

According to the account of Wang Dongxing, who organised the arrests, Wang's personal guards were asked to stay outside the courtyard, and when agents of the Central Security Bureau seized him in the corridor he shouted, "I'm here for the meeting, what are you doing?" while punching and kicking them. He was quickly overpowered and brought into the hall with his arms pinned, where Hua read out the Central Committee's decision to place him under investigation. Before Hua had finished, Wang broke away and lunged at Ye, but guards brought him down, handcuffed him and dragged him to a waiting car.

Wu Jianhua, a senior officer of the Central Security Bureau who took part in the operation, gave a different account in a 2007 memoir. He wrote that Wang arrived at about 7:55 pm and was seized by the assault team as soon as he entered, then held about five metres in front of Hua and Ye while Hua announced the decision. Wang was handcuffed, put into a Hongqi limousine and taken to an isolation room within minutes. Wu dismissed the stories that Wang had broken free and lunged at the leaders as untrue. According to the historian Immanuel C.Y. Hsü, Wang killed two of the agents trying to capture him and was wounded himself before being subdued.

At the third plenary session of the 10th Central Committee, on 21 July 1977, Wang was permanently expelled from the party and removed from all his posts. The plenum denounced him as a "bourgeois careerist, conspirator, counter-revolutionary double-dealer and newly born bourgeois element".

=== Trial ===
Wang was one of ten defendants tried by a special court of the Supreme People's Court in the case of the Lin Biao and Jiang Qing cliques, in a public trial that opened on 20 November 1980. In December 1980, he pleaded guilty to plotting an armed rebellion in Shanghai in late 1976, according to the New China News Agency. Unlike Jiang Qing and Zhang Chunqiao, who were defiant in court, Wang recanted. On 25 January 1981, the court sentenced him to life imprisonment and deprivation of political rights for life. Time described him as a man who had "rocketed from obscurity to the No. 3 slot" in the party hierarchy during the Cultural Revolution.

== Imprisonment and death ==
Wang served his sentence at Qincheng Prison. Qiu Huizuo, a former general who was later held alongside him, wrote in his memoirs that Wang told him he had been kept from sleeping, questioned in relays and forcibly injected with drugs after his arrest. Qiu and the former vice-minister of culture Liu Qingtang both recalled that Wang repeatedly collapsed in the prison grounds, and Liu said that Wang had been diagnosed with an autonomic nervous disorder. He died of liver cancer in a Beijing hospital on 3 August 1992, at the age of 56. His death was reported at the bottom of the second page of the People's Daily on 5 August 1992.

== Personal life ==
Wang met Cui Gendi, a fellow worker at the No. 17 Cotton Mill, at night school. Cui was born in Shanghai in 1940 to a working-class family. The couple married before the Cultural Revolution and had two sons and a daughter. Their daughter Wang Yaping and their sons Wang Yajun and Wang Yamin later went into business in Shanghai. Wang's younger brothers Wang Hongwu and Wang Hongquan remained farmers near Changchun, while another brother, Wang Hongshuang, joined the army in 1958 and later worked at an aircraft repair plant in Wugong County, Shaanxi.

According to the writer Shen Guofan, on 5 October 1976, the day before his arrest, Wang told his secretary Liao Zukang that he expected to lose his post and go to prison, and asked him to propose a divorce to Cui to protect the family. Cui agreed on condition that she kept the children, but Wang was arrested before a divorce could take place. After his fall, Cui refused to divorce him, saying that he had committed crimes and she did not care how he was sentenced, but that he was still young and from a poor background and she would wait for him. She raised their three children alone and every year took them from Shanghai to Qincheng Prison on the couple's wedding anniversary. Cui died in Shanghai on 14 April 2026, aged 86.

Wang was fond of Maotai liquor. According to the writer Ding Dong, he repeatedly bought leftover Maotai from state banquets at the Great Hall of the People, which was rebottled for internal sale at one or two yuan, at a time when a bottle cost six or seven yuan and his monthly salary would have bought only about ten. Some colleagues looked down on him for this, and Wang Hairong and Tang Wensheng reportedly rebuffed his attempts to take advantage of them. Chen Shouxin, an officer of the Central Guard Regiment who inspected Wang's residence at the Diaoyutai State Guesthouse after his arrest, recalled that his main pastimes were hunting, shooting and fishing.
