= Li Zuopeng =

Chinese general and politician (1914–2009)

- 李作鹏
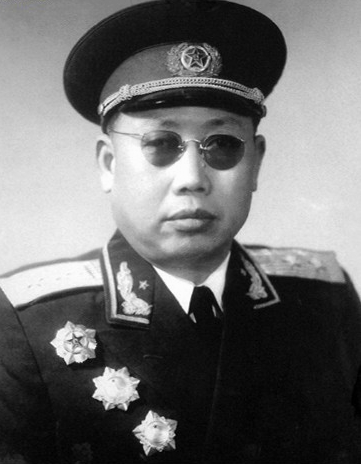

Political Commissar of the People's Liberation Army Navy
- In office 1967–1971

Personal details
- Born: 1914 Jishui, Jiangxi, China
- Died: 3 January 2009 (aged 94–95) Beijing, China
- Party: Chinese Communist Party (expelled 1973)
- Spouse: Dong Qicai
- Children: Li Bingtian (son)

Military service
- Allegiance: People's Republic of China
- Branch/service: Chinese Red Army; People's Liberation Army; People's Liberation Army Navy
- Years of service: 1930–1971
- Rank: Lieutenant general
- Commands: 43rd Army
- Battles/wars: Long March; Second Sino-Japanese War; Chinese Civil War

Li Zuopeng (simplified Chinese: 李作鹏; traditional Chinese: 李作鵬; pinyin: Lǐ Zuòpéng; 1914 – 3 January 2009) was a Chinese general of the People's Liberation Army (PLA) and a member of the 9th Politburo of the Chinese Communist Party. A veteran of the Long March, he commanded the 43rd Army in the Hainan Island campaign of 1950, and he later effectively ran the PLA Navy as its deputy commander and then its first political commissar.

Li was one of the four generals closest to Lin Biao. After Lin's death in September 1971, he was detained, and in 1973 he was expelled from the party. In 1981, a special court sentenced him to 17 years in prison as a principal member of the Lin Biao clique, a verdict that he contested in his memoirs. He died in 2009 at the age of 95.

== Early life ==
Li was born in 1914 into a middle-peasant family from Jishui, in Jiangxi.

== Military career ==
He took part in a peasant uprising in 1929, and in 1930 he joined the Chinese Red Army. He worked in the cipher section and the Second Bureau of the Central Military Commission, where he rose from staff officer to section chief, and he took part in the Long March.

=== Second Sino-Japanese War ===
During the Second Sino-Japanese War, Li lost the sight of his right eye after a Japanese gas attack. With the approval of his commanders Chen Guang and Luo Ronghuan, he travelled to Beijing disguised as a merchant for a cornea transplant, but the operation failed.

=== Chinese Civil War ===
After the war, Li went to Northeast China. In November 1945, as head of the operations department of the Northeast People's Autonomous Army, he went with Lin Biao to the western Liaoning front. He later became deputy commander of the 6th Column under Huang Yongsheng. During the Liaoshen campaign in 1948, the column's leaders decided without waiting for orders to block the retreat of Liao Yaoxiang's army group.

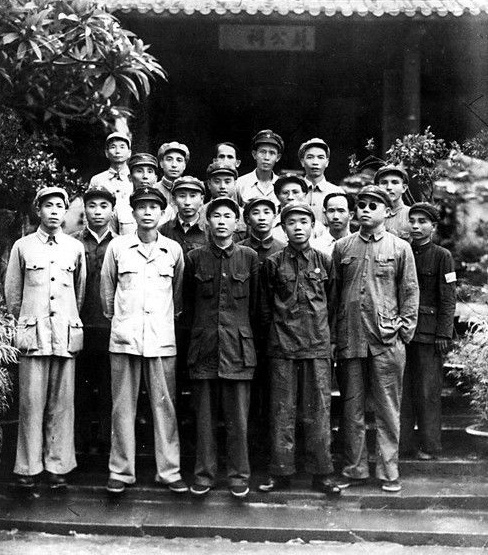
Li Zuopeng (front row, right) with other commanders of the Hainan Island campaign in May 1950

In 1950, Li commanded the 43rd Army in the Hainan Island campaign. After the landings on 17 April, his army and Han Xianchu's 40th Army fought side by side in the battles on the island. During the crossing, Li ordered his troops to keep rowing and to advance, and he warned that anyone who retreated would face military punishment.

=== Navy ===
Before he moved to the navy, Li held a series of army staff, training, school and command posts. In 1962, he became deputy commander of the PLA Navy. According to his memoirs, the Central Military Commission had planned to send Li Tianyou to the navy, but the navy commander Xiao Jinguang objected and asked for Li Zuopeng instead. In 1967, Li became the navy's first political commissar, and he was later appointed a deputy chief of the General Staff and a member of the Central Military Commission.

The analysts Kenneth Allen and his colleagues write that Li effectively ran the navy from 1962 to 1971, that he put politics above everything else, and that he persecuted officers who disagreed with him, especially from 1967 to 1971. In their view, he probably did more harm to the navy's development than any other leader until the late 1970s. A Hong Kong study of the navy, translated by the United States government, states that Li's group forced out officers such as Zhang Xusan of the North Sea Fleet and Nie Kuiju during the Cultural Revolution.

== Cultural Revolution ==
In March 1968, Li joined the Administrative Group of the Central Military Commission, which was headed by Huang Yongsheng and included Wu Faxian, Ye Qun and Qiu Huizuo. On 28 April 1969, the first plenum of the 9th Central Committee elected him to the Politburo. At the Central Committee plenum at Lushan in August 1970, Li sided with Lin Biao in the dispute over restoring the post of state chairman. In the group discussions there, he joined Wu Faxian and Qiu Huizuo in criticising Zhang Chunqiao without naming him.

=== Lin Biao incident ===
On 13 September 1971, Lin Biao fled by air from Shanhaiguan, and he was killed when his aircraft crashed. According to the official account, Premier Zhou Enlai twice ordered that Lin's aircraft must not take off, but Li twice altered the premier's instructions and allowed Lin to escape. Li maintained that Zhou had ordered only that the aircraft could not fly without instructions from Zhou, Huang, Wu and Li, and that he had added the requirement for a joint order to prevent Wu from moving the aircraft on his own. He also argued that Zhou never ordered the airfield closed, and that the rule of joint responsibility could not have stopped a forced takeoff.

On 29 September 1971, the Central Committee ordered Li, Huang, Wu and Qiu to step down and examine their conduct. In October, Li was detained. The Japanese foreign ministry noted at the time that Lin and his four generals had disappeared from public view. In 1973, the party expelled Li and removed him from all his posts.

=== Trial ===
After the fall of the Gang of Four, Li was moved to Qincheng Prison. In November 1980, he went on trial before a special court of the Supreme People's Court as one of the main defendants in the case of the Lin Biao and Jiang Qing cliques. He faced four charges: leaking remarks that Mao Zedong had made on his southern tour in 1971, responsibility for Lin's escape from Shanhaiguan, preparing material that framed Luo Ruiqing, He Long and Ye Jianying, and persecuting 120 navy cadres. His defence lawyers, Zhang Sizhi and Su Youyu, challenged the evidence, and the court rejected the charge of leaking Mao's remarks.

On 25 January 1981, the court sentenced Li to 17 years in prison and five years' deprivation of political rights. Li argued that his conduct amounted at most to political errors rather than crimes, and in notes on his copy of the judgment he argued that the charges could not be separated from Mao's own actions. The judge Wu Xiuquan later wrote that Li had a very clear mind and would not admit to anything that he had not done. The West German China scholar Wolfgang Bartke doubted the official account of a coup plot, and he argued that the removal of Lin's entire faction suggested the elimination of rivals in the succession.

== Later life ==
Li was later released on bail and settled in Taiyuan, Shanxi. The authorities asked him to change his name, and after repeated persuasion he agreed to use the name Li Ming. The writer Wu Dongfeng interviewed him at his home in Taiyuan on 8 July 1995. Li's memoirs, which defended his record, were published in Hong Kong in 2011. The historian Wang Haiguang noted that Li wrote them without showing them to his children, and he cautioned that such memoirs needed to be checked against archives and other accounts.

Li died on 3 January 2009 at the age of 95.

== Personal life ==
Li's wife was Dong Qicai. In a letter to the navy's party committee, Li asked that his personal belongings be returned to his children, and he wrote that they were living in hardship. His son Li Bingtian provided material for Wu Dongfeng's 2010 profile of his father.
