= 9th National Congress of the Chinese Communist Party =

1969 Chinese Communist Party conference

9th National Congress of the Chinese Communist Party 中国共产党第九次全国代表大会
- Begins: April 1, 1969
- Ends: April 24, 1969
- Locations: Great Hall of the People, Beijing, China
- Previous event: 8th National Congress of the Chinese Communist Party (1956 & 1958)
- Next event: 10th National Congress of the Chinese Communist Party (1973)
- Participants: 1,152 delegates
- Major events: Election of the 9th Central Committee
- Leader: Mao Zedong (Leader of the Chinese Communist Party)

9th National Congress of the Chinese Communist Party
- Traditional Chinese: 中國共產黨第九次全國代表大會
- Simplified Chinese: 中国共产党第九次全国代表大会
Transcriptions
Standard Mandarin
- Hanyu Pinyin: Zhōngguó Gòngchǎndǎng Dìjiǔcì Quánguó Dàibiǎo Dàhuì

Abbreviated name
- Chinese: 九大
Transcriptions
Standard Mandarin
- Hanyu Pinyin: Jiǔ-dà

The 9th National Congress of the Chinese Communist Party (CCP) was held in the Great Hall of the People, Beijing, between April 1 and 24, 1969. 1,512 delegates represented the party's estimated 22 million members.

Preceded by the lengthy 8th Congress, the Congress was held at the height of the Cultural Revolution, and is considered to be a pivotal event. The Congress formally ratified the political purge of Liu Shaoqi and Deng Xiaoping, and elevated Mao's radical allies to power. The Congress also elected the 9th Central Committee of the CCP. It was succeeded by the 10th Congress.

== The Congress ==
Lin Biao delivered the keynote political report at the congress. The report lauded Mao's concept of continuous revolution, i.e., that the bourgeoisie continues to attempt capitalist restoration after they have been overthrown from power, and that such attempts should be struck down preemptively. Lin's keynote address was strongly applauded by the delegates, and frequently interrupted by rounds of slogan-chanting. The Congress labeled Liu Shaoqi as the "exemplification of the bourgeoisie".

1,512 delegates were represented at the Congress, although they were not all members of the Party. A significant number represented Red Guards groups, and there was a marked increase in the size of the People's Liberation Army delegation, many of whom were loyal to Lin Biao.

Lin Biao was named "the close comrade-in-arms of Chairman Mao and his successor".

At the Congress, Mao's "continuous revolution" ideology was written into the Party Constitution. Lin Biao proposed that the constitution should include a phrase from Lin's foreword to Quotations from Chairman Mao Zedong: "Comrade Mao Zedong is the greatest Marxist-Leninist of our era. He has inherited, defended, and developed Marxism-Leninism with genius, creatively and comprehensively, and has brought it to a higher and completely new stage." The proposal annoyed Mao. It resulted in debate about whether the concept of "genius" was a bourgeois idea.

Jiang Qing condemned quotation songs, which had been promoted since September 1966 as mnemonic devices for the study of Quotations.

The emphasis placed on Quotations decreased after the Congress.

The Central Secretariat and the Central Control Commission (the predecessor of the Central Commission for Discipline Inspection) were both abolished at this Congress. The Congress elected 170 full members and 109 alternate members of the 9th Central Committee. Of these full and alternate members, only 53 were part of the 8th Central Committee. The significant turnover (~82%) on the party's nominally highest body demonstrated the extent to which the party establishment had been 'cleansed' during the preceding years of the Cultural Revolution.

== Aftermath ==
After Deng Xiaoping took power in 1978, the Congress was deemed to have been "incorrect ideologically, politically, and organizationally. The guiding directions of the congress were, on the whole, wrong." Part of the Long Live the Victory of Mao Zedong Thought statue includes a group of soldiers and civilians propagating the appeal of the 9th National Congress of the Chinese Communist Party.
