= Qiu Huizuo =

Chinese lieutenant general (1914–2002)

Lieutenant General Qiu Huizuo
- 邱会作
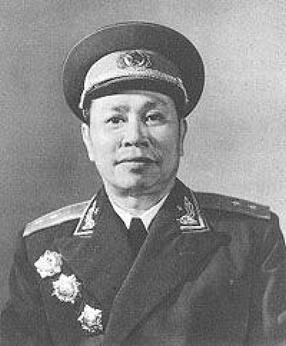
- Qiu Huizuo in 1955

Director of the PLA General Logistics Department
- In office October 14, 1959 – September 24, 1971
- Preceded by: Hong Xuezhi
- Succeeded by: Zhang Zongxun

Personal details
- Born: April 16, 1914 Xingguo, Jiangxi, China
- Died: July 18, 2002 (aged 88) Beijing, China
- Party: Chinese Communist Party

Military service
- Allegiance: China
- Branch/service: People's Liberation Army
- Years of service: 1929–1971
- Rank: Lieutenant General

Qiu Huizuo (Chinese: 邱会作; Wade–Giles: Ch'iu Hui-tso; April 16, 1914 – July 18, 2002) was a lieutenant general of the People's Liberation Army (PLA), best known as one of the "four guardian warriors" of Vice Chairman Lin Biao during the Cultural Revolution. Qiu rose through the ranks of the PLA during the civil war between the Chinese Communist Party and the Kuomintang. He took charge as the PLA logistics chief in 1959, and was persecuted at the beginning of the Cultural Revolution. He was later rehabilitated owing to the blessing of Zhou Enlai and Lin Biao, and elevated to the Politburo of the Chinese Communist Party in 1969. In return, he helped to persecute Lin's enemies and consolidate Lin's power in the PLA. After Lin's flight and death in 1971, Qiu was purged and sentenced to 16 years in prison.

== Revolutionary years ==
Qiu was born in Xingguo County, Jiangxi Province on April 16, 1914. He was schooled in a local sishu (private school specializing in education in Chinese classics).

He joined the militia forces in his home county in 1929 at the age of fifteen. He joined the Chinese Communist Party (CCP) in 1932. In 1934–35, he took part in the Long March. According to Qiu's autobiography, shortly before the Communists' forced exodus from their base in Jiangxi, he was almost executed by party intelligence officials who thought he possessed too much sensitive information regarding military logistics. However, on the way to his execution, he ran into Zhou Enlai, who spared his life and put him under the wing of the logistics head Ye Jizhuang. By the time the Communist forces arrived in northern Shaanxi, Qiu was tasked with logistical work, ensuring that the army had sufficient supplies.

After the Chinese Civil War resumed between the CCP and Kuomintang in 1945, Qiu served in Manchuria as political commissar of the Eighth Column of Lin Biao's Fourth Field Army. Qiu, being a relatively junior officer, was not particularly close to Lin Biao at the time. He did not meet Lin in person until 1948, when Lin put him in charge of logistics of the Fourth Field Army. Qiu did work closely with Huang Yongsheng, who was commander of the Eighth Column. They participated in the Liaoshen Campaign, Pingjin Campaign, and the Hengbao Campaign.

== Early People's Republic ==
After the CCP won the Civil War and established the People's Republic of China, Qiu was appointed Director of the Political Department of the South China Military Region, serving under commander Ye Jianying and deputy commander Huang Yongsheng.

In 1955, Qiu was appointed deputy director and political commissar of the PLA General Logistics Department (GLD), working under director Hong Xuezhi. He also attained the rank of lieutenant general, when the PLA awarded military ranks for the first time in 1955. At the Lushan Conference in 1959, Defence Minister Peng Dehuai was purged for criticizing Mao Zedong's Great Leap Forward and replaced by Lin Biao. Hong Xuezhi was also dismissed for following Peng's lead, and Qiu was named head of the GLD.

== Cultural Revolution ==
When the Cultural Revolution began in 1966, Qiu was labelled a counter-revolutionary element and targeted by the rebels in the GLD. He was subject to physical abuse and torture, fainting many times. Qiu appealed directly to Lin Biao for help, who arranged his dramatic rescue. In the early hours of 25 January 1967, Lin's men took him from the GLD compound and moved him to a safe location in the Western Hills. Qiu called the day his "rebirth".

After Qiu's release, marshals Liu Bocheng, Nie Rongzhen and Ye Jianying visited Qiu as he was undergoing treatment. The senseless mistreatment of Qiu was one of a series of events that pushed marshals Nie and Ye to voice their displeasure with the Cultural Revolution during the February Countercurrent, the last serious phase of dissent in the senior ranks of the party during the movement. Zhou Enlai himself asked Qiu to be restored in his leadership position in the GLD. On Qiu, Zhou commented, "the logistics department is like a smaller State Council, comrade Qiu has helped me with many things."

In May 1967, Lin Biao appointed Qiu, together with Li Zuopeng and Wu Faxian, leaders of the "proletarian revolutionaries of the armed forces." In return, Qiu helped to persecute Lin's enemies and consolidate Lin's power in the PLA. He authorized the torture of 462 people in the GLD, eight of whom died as a result, including lieutenant generals Fu Lianzhang and Tang Ping. He also attacked General Xiao Hua, director of the PLA General Political Department (GPD), and wreaked havoc in the GPD.

At the 9th National Congress of the Chinese Communist Party in 1969, Qiu and many other PLA generals emerged as the main beneficiaries of the Cultural Revolution after the destruction of the old guard. Qiu was elevated to the Central Committee of the Chinese Communist Party as well as the Politburo. Qiu's political fortunes, however, were short-lived. When Lin Biao fled the country in September 1971 in an event still shrouded in mystery, Qiu was implicated by association. He was relieved of his duties on September 24, 1971, then sent to confinement in a military base in Shunyi while the authorities sorted out the consequences of the incident. Qiu was then expelled from the party in 1973.

== Trial, prison, and release ==
Qiu was considered one of the main culprits of the so-called "Lin Biao-Jiang Qing Counter-revolutionary clique" and went on trial along with the Gang of Four in 1981. Of Lin Biao's inner circle, Qiu was said to have a good attitude during the proceedings, openly confessing to the charges and kneeling in front of Lt. Gen. Tang Ping's widow to seek her forgiveness. On January 25, 1981, he was sentenced to 16 years in prison (including time served since 1971). He was released in 1987 after serving his full sentence, and resettled in Xi'an where he reunited with his family and was afforded some basic benefits from the state as well as a living stipend of about 200 yuan a month. As his health worsened in 2001, he was sent to Peking Union Medical College Hospital for treatment, and died there in 2002.

== Autobiography ==
Qiu wrote an autobiography, released in Hong Kong in 2012, which includes details on the intrigues of the Cultural Revolution and his relationship with Lin Biao. In it, Qiu portrays himself as a bulwark against the political machinations and ambitions of Jiang Qing.
