= Lin Biao =

Chinese marshal and politician (1907–1971)

Marshal Lin Biao
- 林彪
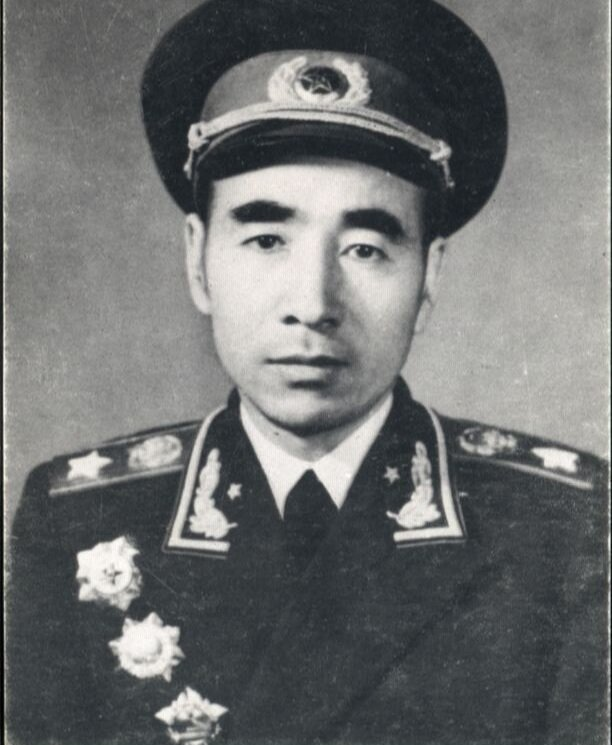
- Official portrait, 1955

Vice Chairman of the Chinese Communist Party
- In office 25 May 1958 – 13 September 1971
- Chairman: Mao Zedong

Vice Premier of China
- In office 15 September 1954 – 13 September 1971
- Premier: Zhou Enlai

2nd Minister of National Defense
- In office 17 September 1959 – 13 September 1971
- Premier: Zhou Enlai
- Preceded by: Peng Dehuai
- Succeeded by: Ye Jianying

Personal details
- Born: Lin Yurong; 5 December 1907 Huanggang, Hubei, China
- Died: 13 September 1971 (aged 63) Öndörkhaan, Mongolia
- Party: Chinese Communist Party (1927–1971)
- Spouse(s): Zhang Mei (1937–42); Ye Qun (1942–71)
- Children: Lin Xiaolin (daughter); Lin Liguo (son); Lin Liheng (daughter)
- Relatives: Lin Yuying (cousin)
- Education: Whampoa Military Academy
- Nicknames: Chief Lin (林总; Lín zǒng); "The Eagle of the Red Army" (红军之鹰; Hóng jūn zhī yīng); 101 (military call sign)

Military service
- Allegiance: Republic of China; People's Republic of China
- Branch/service: People's Liberation Army Ground Force; Chinese Workers' and Peasants' Red Army; National Revolutionary Army
- Years of service: 1925–1971
- Rank: Marshal of the People's Republic of China; Lieutenant general (NRA)
- Commands: 1st Corps; 1st Red Army Corps, Chinese Red Army; 115 Division, 8th Route Army; People's Liberation Army
- Battles/wars: Northern Expedition; Chinese Civil War; Encirclement campaigns; Long March; Liaoshen campaign; Pingjin campaign; Second Sino-Japanese War; Battle of Taiyuan; Battle of Pingxingguan
- Awards: Order of Bayi (first class); Order of Independence and Freedom (first class); Order of Liberation (first class)

Lin Biao
- "Lin Biao" in regular Chinese characters
- Chinese: 林彪
Transcriptions
Standard Mandarin
- Hanyu Pinyin: Lín Biāo
- Wade–Giles: Lin^{2} Piao^{1}
- IPA: [lǐn pjáʊ]
Yue: Cantonese
- Yale Romanization: Làhm Bīu
- Jyutping: Lam^{4} Biu^{1}
- IPA: [lɐm˩ piw˥]
Southern Min
- Hokkien POJ: Lîm Piu

Lin Biao (Chinese: 林彪; 5 December 1907 – 13 September 1971) was a Chinese military commander and politician. Pivotal to the Communist victory in the Chinese Civil War, he commanded the Liaoshen and Pingjin campaigns at the head of the Manchurian Field Army, led the People's Liberation Army into Beijing, and swept the Kuomintang from the coastal provinces of Southeast China. He was ranked third among the Ten Marshals of the People's Republic of China, behind Zhu De and Peng Dehuai.

After 1949, Lin initially withdrew from active politics. He served as a Vice Premier from 1954 and as one of the Vice Chairmen of the Chinese Communist Party from 1958, before assuming the additional post of Minister of National Defense in 1959. In the early 1960s he played a key role in cultivating Mao Zedong's cult of personality, and was rewarded during the Cultural Revolution by being designated Mao's sole successor as the Party's only Vice Chairman, a position he held from 1966 until his death.

Lin died on 13 September 1971 when a Hawker Siddeley Trident crashed near Öndörkhaan, Mongolia, in circumstances that remain disputed. The official Chinese account of the "Lin Biao incident" holds that Lin and his family were fleeing after a failed coup attempt against Mao; others contend they fled fearing imminent purge. He was posthumously condemned as a traitor, and since the late 1970s has been officially grouped with Jiang Qing as one of the two principal "counter-revolutionary" forces held responsible for the worst excesses of the Cultural Revolution.

== Revolutionary ==
=== Youth ===
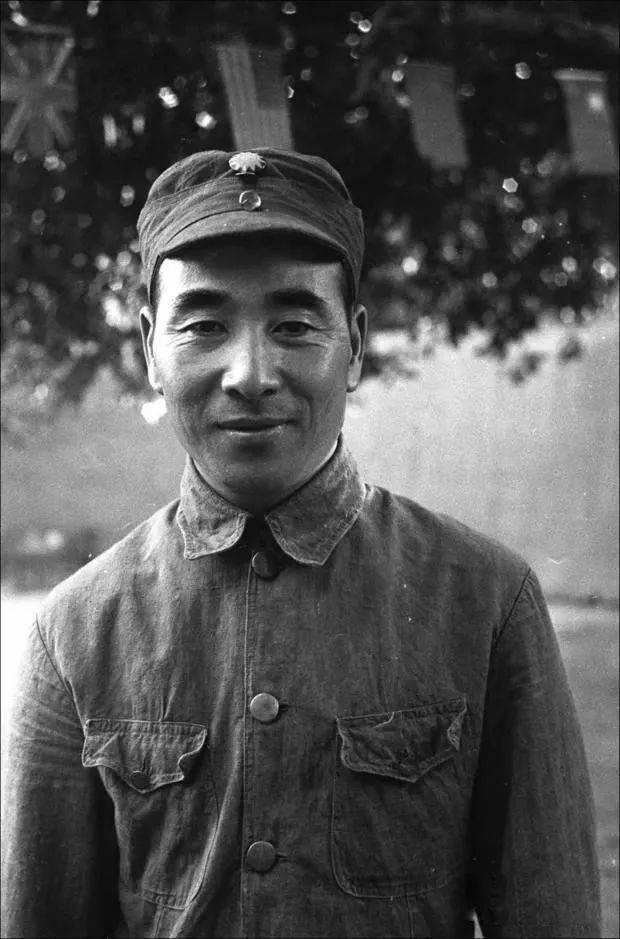
Lin Biao in Kuomintang uniform, 1944

Lin Biao was the son of a prosperous merchant family in Huanggang, Hubei. His name at birth was "Lin Yurong". Lin's father opened a small handicrafts factory in the mid-late 1910s, but was forced to close the factory due to "heavy taxes imposed by local militarists". After closing the factory, Lin's father worked as a purser aboard a river steamship. Lin entered primary school in 1917, and moved to Shanghai in 1919 to continue his education. As a child, Lin was much more interested in participating in student movements than in pursuing his formal education. Lin transferred to Wuchang Gongjin High School (武昌共进中学) at 15. Lin joined a satellite organization of the Communist Youth League before he graduated high school in 1925. Later in 1925 he participated in the May Thirtieth Movement and enrolled in the newly established Whampoa (Huangpu) Military Academy in Guangzhou.

As a young cadet, Lin admired the personality of Chiang Kai-shek (Jiang Jieshi), who was then the principal of the academy. At Whampoa, Lin also studied under Zhou Enlai, who was eight years older than Lin. Lin had no contact with Zhou after their time in Whampoa, until they met again in Yan'an in the late 1930s. Lin's relationship with Zhou was never especially close, but they rarely opposed each other directly.

After graduating from Whampoa in 1926, Lin was assigned to a regiment commanded by Ye Ting. Less than a year after graduating from Whampoa, he was assigned to the Northern Expedition, where he rose from deputy platoon leader to battalion commander within a few months. During this time Lin joined the Communist Party. By 1927 Lin was a colonel.

When he was twenty, Lin married a girl from the countryside with the family name "Ong". This marriage was arranged by Lin's parents, and the couple never became close. When Lin left the Kuomintang to become a communist revolutionary, Ong did not accompany Lin, and their marriage effectively ended.

=== Chinese Civil War ===
After the Kuomintang-Communist split, Lin's commander, Ye Ting, joined forces with He Long and participated in the Nanchang Uprising on 1 August 1927. During the campaign Lin worked as a company commander under a regiment led by Chen Yi. Following the failure of the revolt, Lin escaped to the remote Communist base areas, and joined Mao Zedong and Zhu De in the Jiangxi–Fujian Soviet in 1928. After joining forces with Mao, Lin became one of Mao's closest supporters.

Lin became one of the most senior military field commanders within the Jiangxi Soviet. He commanded the First Army Group, and achieved a degree of power comparable to that of Peng Dehuai, who commanded the Third Army Group. According to Comintern representative Otto Braun, Lin was "politically ... a blank sheet on which Mao could write as he pleased" during this period. After Mao was removed from power in 1932 by his rivals (the 28 Bolsheviks), Lin frequently attended strategic meetings in Mao's name and openly attacked the plans of Mao's enemies.

Within the Jiangxi Soviet, Lin's First Army Group was the best-equipped and arguably most successful force within the Red Army. Lin's First Army became known for its mobility, and for its ability to execute successful flanking maneuvers. Between 1930 and 1933, Lin's forces captured twice the number of prisoners of war and military equipment as the Third and Fifth Army Groups combined. The successes of Lin's forces are due partially to the division of labour within the Red Army: Lin's forces were more offensive and unorthodox than other groups, allowing Lin to capitalize on other Red Army commanders' successes.

During the Communists' defense against Chiang's 1933–34 Fifth Encirclement Campaign, Lin advocated a strategy of protracted guerilla warfare, and opposed the positional warfare advocated by Braun and his supporters. Lin believed that the best way to destroy enemy soldiers was not to pursue them or defend strategic points, but to weaken the enemy through feints, ambushes, encirclements, and surprise attacks. Lin's views generally conformed with the tactics advocated by Mao.

After Chiang's forces successfully occupied several strategic locations within the Jiangxi Soviet, in 1934, Lin was one of the first Red Army commanders to publicly advocate the abandonment of the Jiangxi Soviet, but he was opposed by most Red Army commanders, especially Braun and Peng Dehuai. After the Communists finally resolved to abandon their base, later in 1934, Lin continued his position as one of the most successful commanders in the Red Army during the Long March. Under the direction of Mao and Zhou, the Red Army finally arrived at the remote Communist base of Yan'an, Shaanxi, in December 1936.

Lin and Peng Dehuai were generally considered the Red Army's best battlefield commanders, and were not rivals during the Long March. Both of them had supported Mao's rise to de facto leadership at the Zunyi Conference in January 1935. Lin may have become privately dissatisfied with Mao's strategy of constant evasion by the end of the Long March, but continued to support Mao publicly.

The American journalist Edgar Snow met Lin Biao in the Communist base of Shaanxi in 1936, and wrote about Lin in his book, Red Star Over China. Snow's account focused more on the role of Peng than Lin, evidently having had long conversations with, and devoting two whole chapters to, Peng (more than any other individual apart from Mao). Though he said of Lin:

Lin Biao did not present the bluff, lusty face of Peng Dehuai. He was ten years younger, rather slight, oval-faced, dark, handsome. Peng talked with his men. Lin kept his distance. To many he seemed shy and reserved. There are no stories reflecting warmth and affection for his men. His fellow Red Army commanders respected Lin, but when he spoke, it was all business ...

The contrast between Mao's top field commanders could hardly have been more sharp, but on the Long March they worked well together, Lin specializing in feints, masked strategy, surprises, ambushes, flank attacks, pounces from the rear, and stratagems. Peng met the enemy head-on in frontal assaults and fought with such fury that again and again he wiped them out. Peng did not believe a battle well fought unless he managed to replenish—and more than replenish—any losses by seizure of enemy guns and converting prisoners of war to new and loyal recruits to the Red Army.

With Mao Zedong, Lin Biao shared the distinction of being one of the few Red commanders never wounded. Engaged on the front in more than a hundred battles, in field command for more than 10 years, exposed to every hardship that his men have known, with a reward of $100,000 on his head, he miraculously remained unhurt and in good health.

In 1932, Lin Biao was given command of the 1st Red Army Corps, which then numbered about 20,000 rifles. It became the most dreaded section of the Red Army. Chiefly due to Lin's extraordinary talent as a tactician, it destroyed, defeated or outmanoeuvered every Government force sent against it and was never broken in battle ....

Like many able Red commanders, Lin has never been outside China, speaks and reads no language but Chinese. Before the age of 30, however, he has already won recognition beyond Red circles. His articles in the Chinese Reds' military magazines ... have been republished, studied and criticised in Nanking (Nanjing) military journals, and also in Japan and Soviet Russia.

Within a year of Snow's reporting, Lin was seriously wounded. A Red Army soldier shot him by mistake.

Lin and Mao generally had a close personal relationship, but some accounts claim that Lin sometimes made disparaging comments about Mao in private, and that Lin's support of Mao was largely for the pursuit of power. After arriving in Yan'an, Lin became the principal of the newly founded Chinese People's Anti-Japanese Military and Political University. In 1937, Lin married one of the students there, a girl named Liu Ximin, who had earned the nickname "University Flower".

=== Chinese-Japanese War (1931–1945) ===
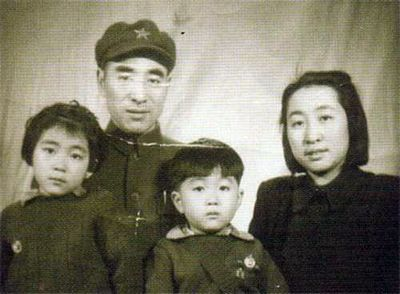
Lin Biao with wife Ye Qun and their children

In August 1937, Lin was named commander-in-chief of the 115th Division of the Communist 8th Route Army and ordered to aid Yan Xishan's forces in repelling the Japanese invasion of Shanxi. In this capacity, Lin orchestrated the ambush at Pingxingguan in September 1937, which was one of the few battlefield successes for the Chinese in the early period of the Second Sino-Japanese War (known in China as the "War of Resistance Against Japan").

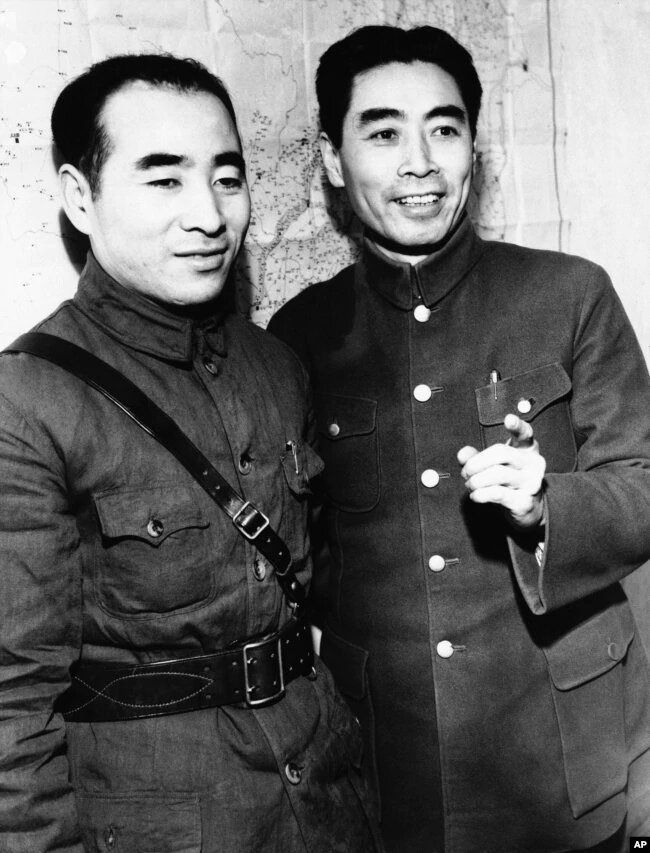
Lin with Zhou Enlai in National Revolutionary Army uniforms (1943)

In 1938, while he was still leading Chinese forces in Shanxi, Japanese soldiers who had joined the Communists and were serving under Lin's command presented Lin with a Japanese uniform (reportedly an officer's winter coat, which Lin eagerly accepted as he lacked a suitable one himself) and katana, which they had captured in battle. Lin then put the uniform and katana on, jumped onto a horse, and rode away from the army. While riding, Lin was spotted alone by a sharpshooter in Yan's army. The soldier was surprised to see a Japanese officer riding a horse in the desolate hills alone. He took aim at Lin and severely injured him. The bullet grazed Lin's head, penetrating deep enough to leave a permanent impression on his skull. After being shot in the head, Lin fell from his horse and injured his back.

Recovering from his wounds and ill with tuberculosis, Lin left for Moscow at the end of 1938, where he served as the representative of the Chinese Communist Party to the Executive Committee of the Communist International. He remained in Moscow until February 1942, working on Comintern affairs and writing for its publication. Lin was accompanied by his wife, Liu Ximin, but their relationship deteriorated in Moscow, and Lin eventually returned to Yan'an without her.

While in Moscow, Lin became infatuated with Zhou Enlai's adopted daughter, Sun Weishi, who was studying in Moscow from 1938 to 1946. Before returning to China, in 1942, Lin proposed to Sun and promised to divorce his wife, from whom Lin had become estranged. Sun was not able to accept Lin's proposal, but promised to consider marrying Lin after completing her studies. Lin divorced Liu Ximin after returning to China, and married another woman, Ye Qun, in 1943. The relationship between Sun and Ye was notably bad. After returning to Yan'an, Lin was involved in troop training and indoctrination assignments.

=== Liaoshen Campaign ===
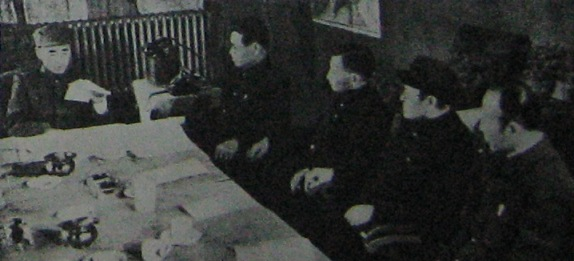
Lin with high-ranking officers under his command (Harbin, 1946)

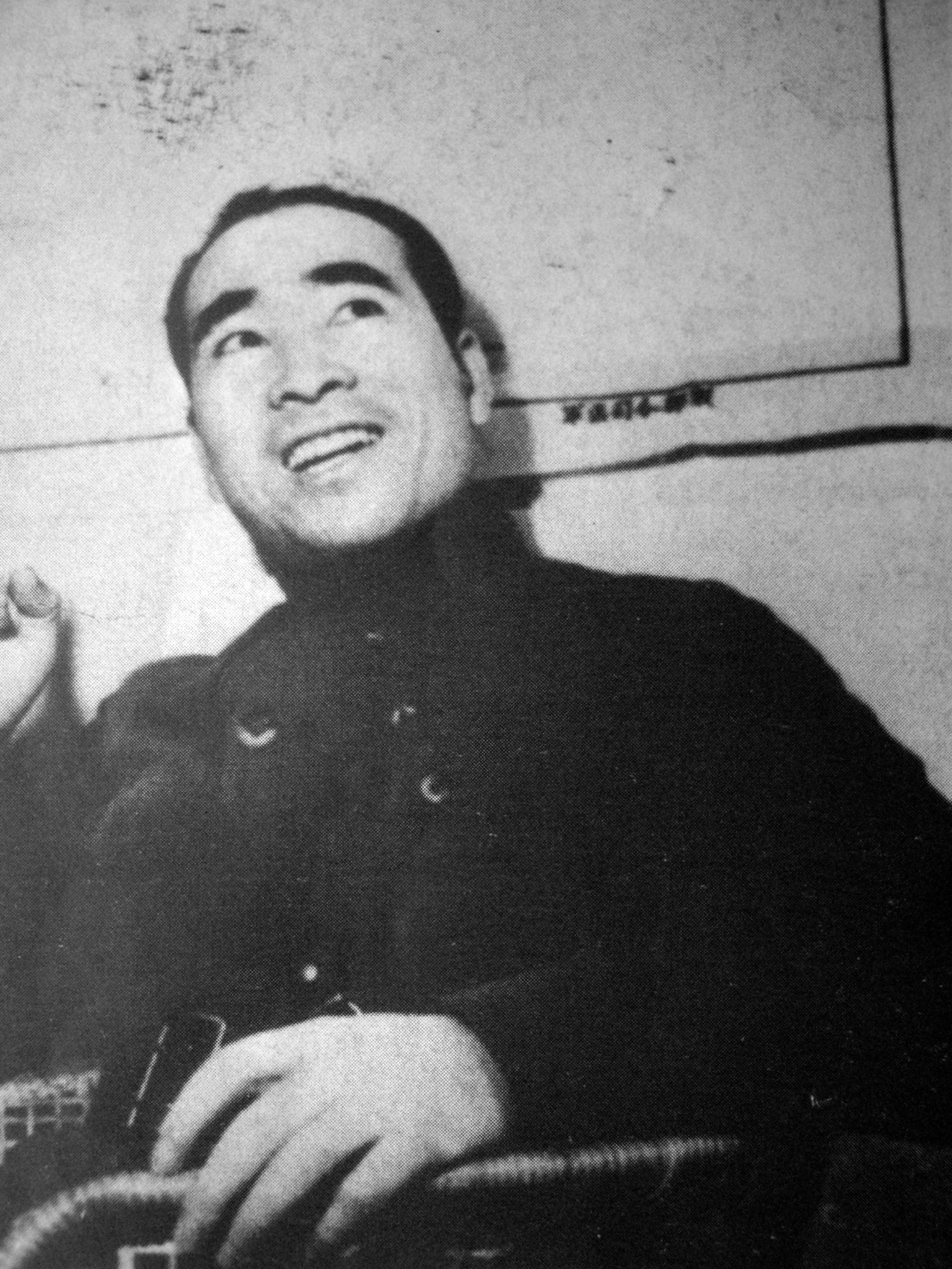
Lin as commander-in-chief of the Manchurian Field Army (~1947–1948)

Lin was absent for most of the fighting during World War II, but was elected the sixth-ranking Central Committee member in 1945 based on his earlier battlefield reputation. After the Japanese surrender, the Communists moved large numbers of troops to Manchuria (Northeast China), and Lin Biao relocated to Manchuria to command the new "Communist Northeast Military District". The Soviets transferred captured Japanese military equipment to the Communists, making Lin's army one of the most well-equipped Communist forces in China. By the time that units from the Kuomintang (Nationalists) were able to arrive in the major cities of Manchuria, Lin's forces were already in firm control of most of the countryside and surrounding areas.

By the end of 1945, Lin had 280,000 troops in Manchuria under his command, but according to Kuomintang estimates only 100,000 of these were regular forces with access to adequate equipment. The KMT also estimated that Lin also had access to 100,000 irregular auxiliaries, whose membership was drawn mainly from unemployed factory workers. Lin avoided decisive confrontations throughout 1945, and he was able to preserve the strength of his army despite criticism from his peers in the Party and the PLA.

For the sake of bargaining with the Kuomintang in peace negotiations in 1946, Mao ordered Lin to assemble his army to take and defend key cities, which was against the previous strategy of the Red Army. Lin disagreed with this position, but was ordered by Mao to draw the KMT into a decisive battle and "not give an inch of land" around Siping, Jilin. On 15 April, Lin orchestrated an ambush and forced KMT forces there to withdraw with heavy casualties. When the local KMT commander, Du Yuming, launched a counterattack on 18 April, Mao ordered the troops there to hold the city indefinitely. The fighting continued until Mao finally allowed Lin to withdraw on 19 May, which Lin did immediately, barely saving his army from encirclement and destruction.

Du pursued Lin's forces to the south bank of the Songhua River, where they halted due to Du's concerns about his army becoming overextended. According to Communist sources, Lin's army lost 15,000 soldiers in the fighting and withdrawal, but Nationalist sources claim that 25,000 soldiers also deserted or surrendered, and that Lin's force of 100,000 irregular auxiliaries suffered from mass desertion during the retreat. On 10 June, the two forces agreed to a ceasefire brokered by George Marshall, and fighting temporarily ceased. Mao ordered Lin to counterattack that winter, but Lin refused, replying that his forces were exhausted and not logistically prepared to do so.

When Du led the majority of his forces to attack Communist forces on the Korean border in January 1947, Lin finally ordered 20,000 of his soldiers to cross the Songhua River, where they staged guerrilla raids, ambushed relief forces, attacked isolated garrisons, and avoided decisive confrontations with strong units Du sent to defeat them. While they did so, they looted large quantities of supplies and destroyed the infrastructure of the KMT-held territories that they passed through, including bridges, railroads, fortifications, electrical lines, and boats. When Du sent his forces back south, they were ambushed and defeated. When Du requested reinforcements from Chiang Kai-shek, his request was rejected.

On 8 April, Lin moved his headquarters from Harbin to Shuangcheng in order to be closer to the front. On 5 May, he held a conference with his subordinates and announced that his armies would change tactics, engage in a large-scale counterattack, and seek to defeat Du's forces in a decisive battle. On 8 May, Lin launched the first of his "three great campaigns", the Summer Offensive, intending to engage a large garrison at Huaide while a second force positioned itself to ambush the force that would predictably be sent to relieve it. On 17 May, they won a major victory and forced the survivors to retreat to Changchun and Siping. By the end of May 1947, Lin's forces had taken control of most of the countryside (everything except for the rail lines and several major cities), infiltrated and destroyed most KMT forces in Manchuria, and re-established contact with isolated Communist forces in southern Liaoning province.

After the victory of the Summer Offensive, Lin's forces gained the initiative and Kuomintang defensive strategy became static and reactionary. Lin ordered his forces to besiege Siping, but they suffered very high casualties and made little progress, partially due to the defenders' strong entrenched position and air support, and due to the attackers' poor artillery support (Lin only had seventy pieces of artillery around Siping). Lin's forces broke into the city twice and engaged in street-to-street fighting, but were driven back both times with heavy casualties. By 19 June, Lin's assault troops had become increasingly exhausted, and Lin began to rotate them to prevent them from becoming completely ineffective. On 24 June, Nationalist reinforcements arrived from the south to lift the siege. Lin recognized that he did not have enough manpower left to defeat them, and on 1 July, he ordered his forces to retreat back to the north of the Songhua River.

The Communists suffered over 30,000 losses at Siping, and may have suffered a desertion rate of over 20% during the withdrawal, while the Nationalist garrison at Siping fell from 20,000 to slightly over 3,000 before the siege was broken. Lin volunteered to write a self-criticism after the defeat. He also criticized his commander at Siping, Li Tianyou, for demonstrating poor tactics and for lacking "revolutionary spirit". Despite the army's setbacks he reorganized the army, combining surviving regiments and raising local militia forces to the status of regular units. By the fall of 1947, he had 510,000 soldiers under his command, approximately equal to Nationalist forces in the region.

Before Du's replacement, Chen Cheng, could cross north and begin an offensive, Lin moved his army south and began the Autumn Offensive, in which his forces destroyed rail lines and other infrastructure, attacked isolated Nationalist units, and attempted to provoke and ambush strong Nationalist forces. Chen's forces responded to the campaign by withdrawing into their city garrisons. The Communists were not able to provoke a decisive confrontation, and the Autumn Offensive ended in a stalemate.

Chen's forces remained static and reactionary, at the end of 1947, Lin led his armies back south in his final Liaoshen Campaign, the Winter Offensive. His initial plan was to repeat the goal of his last offensive, to besiege Jilin City and ambush its relief force, but after reviewing Kuomintang troop dispositions he determined that southern Manchuria would be an easier target. On 15 December, Lin's forces attacked Fakui, Zhangwu, and Xinlitun. Chen sent reinforcements to relieve Fakui, and when the Communist ambush failed, Lin ordered his forces to withdraw and join in the siege of Zhangwu. When Chen did not intervene and the town fell on 28 December, Lin assumed the main part of the campaign was over and he dispersed his forces to rest and attack secondary targets.

Chen saw Lin's withdrawal as an opportunity to seize the offensive. He ordered his forces to attack targets in northern Liaoning on 1 January 1948, and on 3 January, Lin successfully encircled the isolated Nationalist 5th Corps. Its commander, Chen Linda, realized that he was being surrounded and requested reinforcements, but Chen Cheng only responded that he would "allow" Chen Linda to withdraw. The attempted breakout failed, and the 5th Corps was destroyed on 7 January. After this defeat, Chen Cheng was replaced with Wei Lihuang ten days later, but Wei was not able to prevent the Communists from capturing Liaoyang on 6 February, destroying the 54th division, and severing an important railroad that linked Wei's forces from their ports on the Bohai Sea.

Lin continued his advance, defeating all garrisons in western Manchuria or inducing them to defect by late February. On 26 February Lin reorganized his forces as the Northeastern Field Army and began preparations to return and take Siping, whose garrison had been transferred elsewhere by Chen Cheng and never re-strengthened. Lin began the general assault on the city on 13 March, and took the town one day later. The capture of Siping ended Lin's Winter Offensive. The KMT nearly lost all of Manchuria by the end of the campaign and suffered 156,000 casualties, most of which survived as prisoners of war that were indoctrinated and recruited into Lin's forces. By the end of winter 1948 the Kuomintang had lost all of its territory in the Northeast, except for Changchun, Shenyang, and an area connecting the rail line from Beiping to those cities.

Following Lin's Winter campaign, Mao wanted him to attack targets farther south, but Lin disagreed because he did not want to leave a strong enemy at his back, and he believed the defeat of a strong city would force Chiang to abandon the Northeast. By 25 May 1948, the Northeastern Field Army had completely encircled Changchun, including its airfield, and for the rest of the siege the Nationalist commander, Zheng Dongguo, depended entirely on supplies airdropped into the city. On 19 May, Lin submitted a report to Mao in which he expected heavy casualties. By 20 July the siege was at a stalemate, and Lin deferred to Mao, allowing some of his army to attack Jinzhou farther south, beginning the Liaoshen Campaign. When Chiang airlifted reinforcements to defend Jinzhou, Lin ordered his army to abandon the siege and return to Changchun, but Mao disagreed and overruled him, and Lin was ordered to engage the defenders in a decisive confrontation. On 14 October, the Northeast Field Army began its assault on Jinzhou with 250,000 men and the bulk of Lin's artillery and armor. After nearly 24 hours of fighting, Lin's forces were victorious, suffering 24,000 casualties but capturing the enemy commander, Fan Hanjie, and 90,000 enemy soldiers.

After hearing the news about the defeat at Jinzhou, a KMT army from Yunnan and its commander, Zeng Zesheng, defected and abandoned its position on the outskirts of Changchun on 14 October. This doomed the remaining Nationalist forces in the city, and Zheng Dongguo was forced to surrender two days later. Chiang ordered the 9th army of 110,000 men under General Liao Yaoxiang to travel west and retake Jinzhou, but Lin directed nearly all of his forces to stop them, and they began to encircle the relief unit on 21 October. After a week of fighting, the Nationalist army was destroyed on 28 October. Remaining KMT garrisons in the Northeast attempted to break out of the region and flee south, but most were unsuccessful. After Changchun, the only major KMT garrison in the Northeast was Shenyang, where 140,000 KMT soldiers were eventually forced to surrender. By the end of 1948 all of Northeast China was under Communist control.

=== Defeating the Kuomintang ===
After taking control of the Manchurian provinces, Lin then swept into North China. Forces under Lin were responsible for winning two of the three major military victories responsible for the defeat of the Kuomintang. Lin suffered from ongoing periods of serious illness throughout the campaign. Following the victory in Manchuria, Lin commanded over a million soldiers, encircling Chiang's main forces in northern China during the Pingjin Campaign, taking Beijing and Tianjin within a period of two months. Tianjin was taken by force, and on 22 January 1949 General Fu Zuoyi and his army of 400,000 men agreed to surrender Beijing without a battle, and the PLA occupied the city on 31 January. The Pingjin Campaign saw Lin remove a total of approximately 520,000 enemy troops from the enemy's battle lines. Many of those who surrendered later joined the PLA.

After taking Beijing, the Communists attempted to negotiate for the surrender of the remaining KMT forces. When these negotiations failed, Lin resumed his attacks on the KMT in the southeast. After taking Beijing, Lin's army numbered 1.5 million soldiers. He crossed the Yangtze River in the Spring of 1949 and decisively defeated the defending KMT army stationed in central China during the Yangtze River Crossing Campaign. Lin's armies continued to defeat KMT armies farther south, finally occupying all KMT positions on mainland China by the end of 1949. The last position occupied by Lin's forces was the tropical island of Hainan.

Lin Biao was considered one of the Communists' most brilliant generals after the founding of the People's Republic of China, in 1949. Lin was the youngest of the "Ten Marshals" named in 1955, a title that recognized Lin's substantial military contributions.

== Politician ==
=== Illness ===
Lin Biao continued to have poor health after 1949, and chose to avoid high-profile military and political positions. His status led him to be appointed to a number of high-profile positions throughout most of the 1950s, but these were largely honorary and carried few responsibilities. He generally delegated or neglected many of the formal political responsibilities that he was assigned, usually citing his poor health.

After Lin's injury in 1938, he suffered from ongoing physical and mental health problems. A theory holds that his lifelong health problems may have resulted from the injury. His exact medical condition is not well understood, partially because his medical records have never been publicly released. Dr. Li Zhisui, then one of Mao's personal physicians, believed that Lin suffered from neurasthenia and hypochondria. He became ill whenever he perspired, and suffered from phobias about water, wind, cold, light, and noise. He was said to become nervous at the sight of rivers and oceans in traditional Chinese paintings, and suffered from diarrhea, which could be triggered by the sound of running water. Li's account of Lin's condition is notably different from the official Chinese version.

In another study, Lin is described as having symptoms similar to those seen in patients of schizoid personality disorder. Lin's personality traits including his aloofness, lack of interest in social relationships, secretiveness, and emotional coldness he exhibited during the Cultural Revolution; indeed, all of these were symptoms very similar to those seen in individuals who have schizoid personality disorder. The challenge of Lin's personality problems in conjunction with the turbulent political climate of the Cultural Revolution impacted his overall ability to govern his position.

Lin suffered from excessive headaches, and spent much of his free time consulting Chinese medical texts and preparing traditional Chinese medicines for himself. He suffered from insomnia, and often took sleeping pills. He ate simple meals, did not smoke, and did not drink alcohol. As his condition progressed, his fear of water led to a general refusal to either bathe or eat fruit. Because of his fear of wind and light, his office was gloomy and lacked any ventilation. Some accounts have suggested that Lin became a drug addict, either to opium or morphine.

As early as 1953, Soviet doctors diagnosed Lin as suffering from manic depression. Lin's wife, Ye Qun, rejected this diagnosis, but it was later confirmed by Chinese doctors. Lin's fragile health made him vulnerable, passive, and easily manipulated by other political figures, notably Ye Qun herself.

Lin's complaints got worse with time and age. In the years before his death, the fiancée of Lin's son reported that Lin became extremely distant and socially and politically detached, even to the extent that he never read books or newspapers. His passivity made him difficult to connect with at any meaningful level: "usually he just sat there, blankly". In Lin's rare periods of activity, he used his time mostly to complain about, and seek treatment for his large variety of medical issues.

=== Alliance with Mao ===
Lin, like most of the Politburo, initially held serious reservations about China's entry into the Korean War, citing the devastation that would result if the "imperialists" (Americans) detonated an atomic bomb in Korea or China. Lin later declined to lead forces in Korea, citing his ill health. In early October 1950, Peng Dehuai was named commander of the Chinese forces bound for Korea, and Lin went to the Soviet Union for medical treatment. Lin flew to the Soviet Union with Zhou Enlai and participated in negotiations with Joseph Stalin concerning Soviet support for China's intervention, indicating that Mao retained his trust in Lin. Due partially to his periods of ill health and physical rehabilitation in the Soviet Union, Lin was slow to rise to power. In the early 1950s Lin was one of five major leaders given responsibility for civil and military affairs, controlling a jurisdiction in central China. In 1953 he was visited by Gao Gang, and was later suspected of supporting him. In 1955 Lin was named to the Politburo.

In February 1958 Peng Dehuai, then China's Defense Minister, gave a speech for the fortieth anniversary of the Soviet Red Army in which he suggested increasing the military cooperation between China and the Soviet Union. Mao wanted to distance China from the Soviet Union, and began grooming Lin Biao as a viable successor to Peng. In 1958 Lin joined the Politburo Standing Committee and became one of China's Vice-chairmen. After the 1959 Lushan Conference, at which Peng criticized Mao's disastrous Great Leap Forward, Peng was arrested and removed from all government positions. Privately, Lin agreed with Peng and was strongly opposed to Peng being purged, but Lin's fear of being purged himself kept him from publicly opposing Mao's efforts to purge Peng, and Lin publicly condemned Peng as a "careerist, a conspiracist, and a hypocrite". Under Mao's direction, Peng was disgraced and put under indefinite house arrest. Lin became the senior leader most publicly supportive of Mao following the Great Leap Forward, during which Mao's economic policies caused an artificial famine in which tens of millions of people starved to death. For example, Lin publicly defended Mao during the Seven Thousand Cadres Conference in 1962.

Lin initially refused to replace Peng, but eventually accepted the position at the insistence of Mao Zedong. As Defense Minister, Lin's command of the PLA was second only to Mao, but he deferred many of his responsibilities to subordinates. The most important figures to whom Lin deferred the day-to-day operations of China's armed forces were Luo Ruiqing, Chief of Staff, and He Long, the Central Military Vice-chairman.

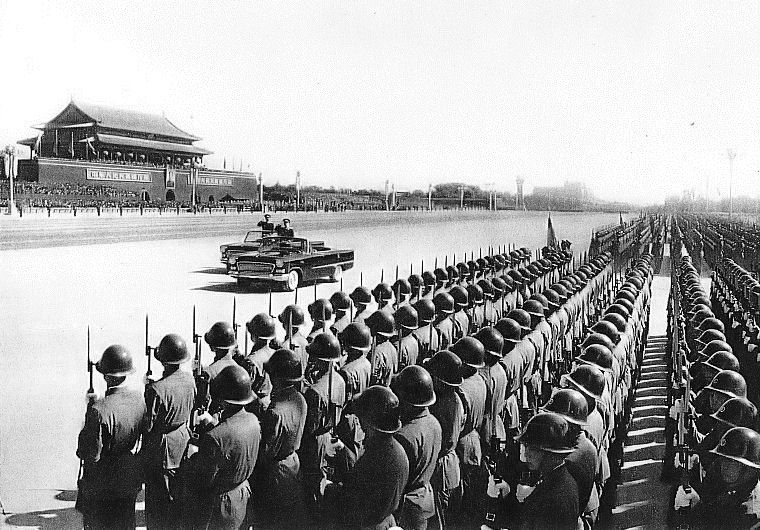
On 1 October 1959, Lin Biao, as defense minister, surveyed the honor guards at the military parade celebrating the 10th anniversary of the founding of the People's Republic of China.

As Defense Minister, Lin's policies differed from those of his predecessor. Lin attempted to reform China's armed forces based on political criteria: he abolished all signs and privileges of rank, purged members considered sympathetic to the USSR, directed soldiers to work part-time as industrial and agricultural workers, and indoctrinated the armed forces in Mao Zedong Thought. Lin's system of indoctrination made it clear the Party was in command of China's armed forces, and Lin ensured that the army's political commissars enjoyed great power and status in order to see that his directives were followed. Lin implemented these reforms in order to please Mao, but privately was concerned that they would weaken the PLA (which they did). Mao strongly approved of these reforms, and conscientiously promoted Lin to a series of high positions.

Lin used his position as Minister of Defense to flatter Mao by promoting Mao's cult of personality. Lin devised and ran a number of national Maoist propaganda campaigns based on the PLA, the most successful of which was the "learn from Lei Feng" campaign, which Lin began in 1963. Because he was the person most responsible for directing the "learn from Lei Feng" campaign, Lin may have directed the forging of Lei Feng's Diary, upon which the propaganda campaign was based.

Because of Lin's fragile health, Ye Qun controlled many aspects of Lin's public life during the 1960s, including who would see Lin and what others would know about him. Mao encouraged Ye to act on Lin's behalf, giving her an unusual amount of power and responsibility. In 1965 Mao asked Ye to publicly criticize Lin's chief of staff, Luo Ruiqing, on Lin's behalf, even though Ye did not yet hold any high political position. When Lin discovered that Ye had done so (after Luo was purged), he was angry at Ye, but powerless to alter Luo's disgrace.

Lin often read speeches prepared by others, and allowed his name to be placed on articles that he did not write, as long as these materials supported Mao. One of the most famous articles published in Lin's name was the 20,000-word pamphlet on revolution in developing countries, Long Live the Victory of the People's War!, which was released in 1965. This article made Lin one of China's leading interpreters of Mao's political theories. The article likened the "emerging forces" of the poor in Asia, Africa, and Latin America to the "rural areas of the world", while the affluent countries of the West were likened to the "cities of the world". Eventually the "cities" would be encircled by revolutions in the "rural areas", following theories prevalent in Mao Zedong Thought. Lin made no promise that China would fight other people's wars, and foreign revolutionaries were advised to depend mainly on "self-reliance".

Lin worked closely with Mao, promoting Mao's cult of personality. Lin directed the compilation of some of Chairman Mao's writings into a handbook, the Quotations from Chairman Mao Zedong, which became known as the Little Red Book. Lin Biao's military reforms and the success of the 1962 Sino-Indian War impressed Mao. A propaganda campaign called "learn from the People's Liberation Army" followed. In 1966, this campaign widened into the Cultural Revolution.

== Cultural Revolution ==
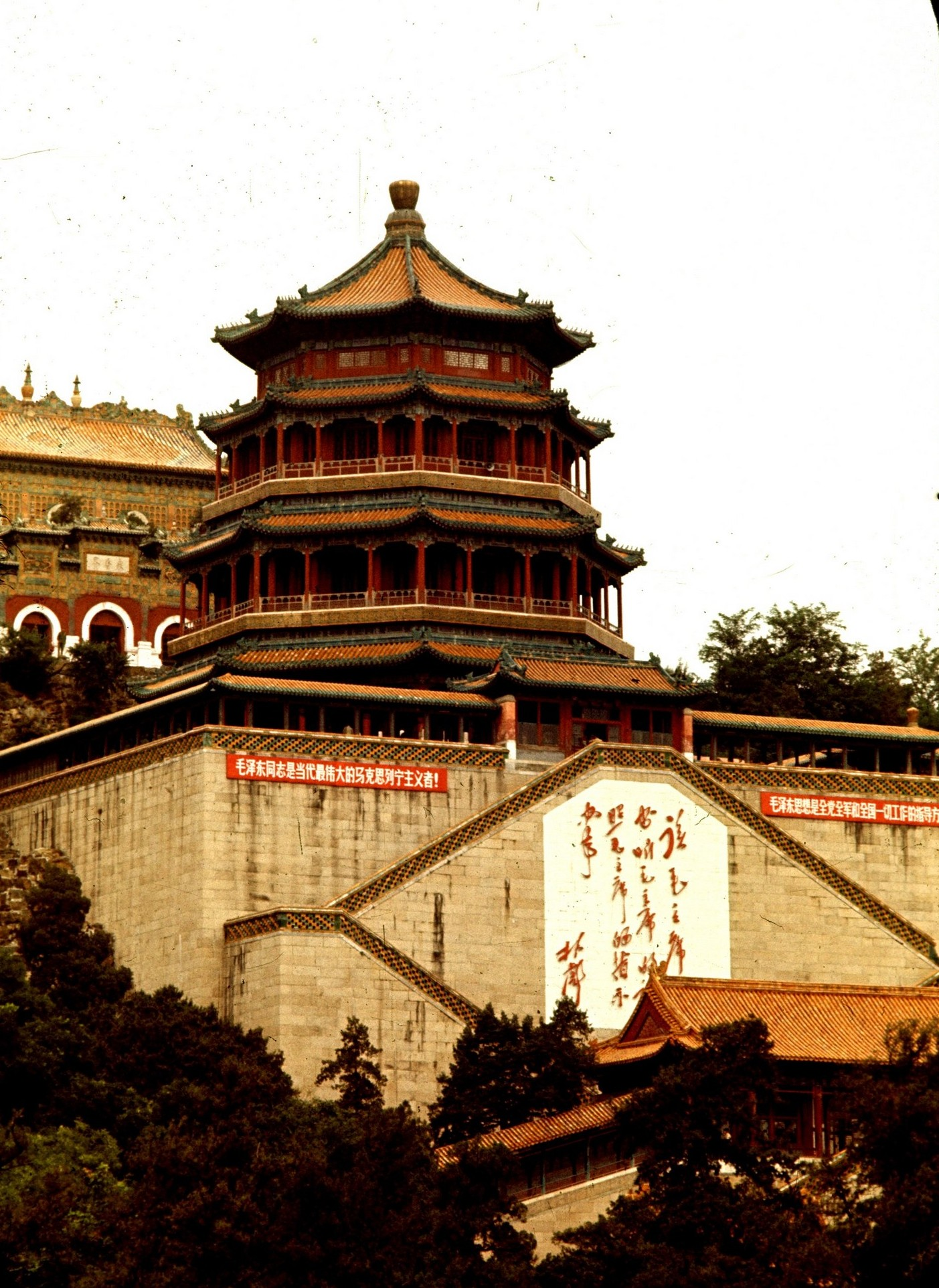
Lin Biao's calligraphy in the Summer Palace, 1966

=== Rise to prominence ===
Lin's support impressed Mao, who continued to promote Lin to higher political offices. After Mao's second-in-command, President Liu Shaoqi, was denounced as a "capitalist roader" in 1966, Lin Biao emerged as the most likely candidate to replace Liu as Mao's successor. Lin attempted to avoid this promotion, but accepted it on Mao's insistence.

Privately, Lin opposed the purging of Liu and Deng Xiaoping, on the grounds that they were "good comrades", but was not able to publicly oppose Mao's condemnation of them. Lin privately admired Liu, and once told his daughter that Liu had "a better understanding of theory than Mao". Zhou Enlai was also considered for the position of vice-chairman, but Zhou successfully withdrew from the nomination, leaving Lin the only candidate.

Lin also seriously attempted to withdraw from the nomination, but was not able to do so because Mao had made Lin's appointment a decision of the Central Committee, so rejecting the position would violate Party procedure and would risk ending Lin's political career. Lin was not present at the conference where it was decided to name him vice chairman. After Lin was named, he met with Mao and begged him personally not to name him to the position, but Mao criticized him, comparing Lin to the Ming emperor Shizong, who devoted so much of his time to the search for longevity medicines that he neglected his government responsibilities. In 1966 all other candidates for the position were removed, and Lin accepted the position as sole Vice-chairman, replacing Liu Shaoqi as Mao's unofficial successor. After his appointment, Lin again attempted to submit a formal written request to Mao, asking Mao to rescind Lin's appointment to the position of vice-chairman, but Mao again rejected this request. When Lin received the rejection letter, he was so angry that he tore the letter up and threw it in the garbage.

Because there was no way to avoid becoming Mao's second-in-command, Lin attempted to protect himself from the chaos of the Cultural Revolution by giving absolute support to Mao and doing very little else. Lin avoided expressing any opinion, or making any decision on any matter, until Mao's own opinions and positions on that matter were clear, after which Lin would adhere as closely to Mao's direction as possible. Lin made sure that, whenever he and Mao were scheduled to appear in the same place, Lin would always arrive earlier than Mao, waiting to greet the chairman. Lin attempted to make all observers believe that he was Mao's closest follower, always appearing beside Mao in all of Mao's public appearances with a copy of Mao's Little Red Book. When he was informed that the public's image of Lin was that he was "Mao's best student", Lin was pleased, and stated: "I don't have any talent. What I know, I learned from Mao."

=== Activities ===
Because Lin had no real interest in the position of vice-chairman, he did little other than whatever he believed would ingratiate himself to Mao. Privately, Lin had no interest in promoting the Cultural Revolution, and attended government meetings only when Mao demanded that he do so. Those colleagues closest to Lin noted that Lin avoided talking about the Cultural Revolution in any context other than public speeches, and when pressed would only make very brief and ambiguous statements. After 1966, Lin made no phone calls, received few visitors, secluded himself from his colleagues, and gained a reputation as being "reticent and mysterious". He did not take an active role in government, but allowed his secretaries to read short summaries of selected documents for half an hour in the morning and half an hour in the afternoon. This was generally insufficient to fulfill the responsibilities of vice-chairman, and he left most important work and family duties to his wife, Ye Qun.

Lin's passivity was part of a calculated plan to survive the Cultural Revolution alive and well. When Lin perceived that his longtime subordinate, Tao Zhu, was in danger of being purged in the beginning of the Cultural Revolution, Lin sent a letter to warn Tao, advising Tao to be "passive, passive, and passive again". Tao probably did not understand Lin's advice, and was subsequently purged in 1967. In his relationship with Mao, Lin adopted a policy of "three 'nos': no responsibility; no suggestions; no crime".

Following the lead of Mao, in 1966 Lin directed Red Guards in Beijing to "smash those persons in power who are traveling the capitalist road, the bourgeoisie reactionary authorities, and all royalists of the bourgeoisie, and to forcibly destroy the "four olds": old culture, old ideas, old customs, and old habits. In August 1966 Lin publicly called for a "three-month turmoil" within the PLA, and on October 6 Lin's Central Military Commission issued an urgent instruction that all military academies and institutes were to dismiss their classes and allow their students to become fully involved in the Cultural Revolution. Following the orders of this directive, officers and commissars were expelled from their positions, and some were beaten to death. Students at Chinese military academies followed Lin's instructions to rebel against their senior officers, breaking into the offices of Lin's National Commission for Defense Science to abduct one of the department's directors, and claiming Lin's deputy chief of staff, Li Tianyu, whom students accused of disciplining them. The students "overthrew" General Xiao Hua, the head of the PLA's Political Department since the previous July, and went on to purge 40 other top officers working under him in the Political Department, most of whom died in prison.

Lin continued to support the Red Guards until May 1967, when Mao accepted Zhou Enlai's appeals to moderate their radical activity through military intervention. Lin moderated some of the most radical activity within the PLA; but, from 1967 to 1969, 80,000 officers were purged, 1,169 of whom died from torture, starvation, or execution. Research programs were cancelled and the number of military academies across China shrank by two-thirds. Many defensive fortifications were destroyed, and regular training within the PLA ceased.

After 1966, Lin's few personal political initiatives were efforts to moderate the radical nature of the Cultural Revolution. Privately, he expressed unhappiness with the Cultural Revolution, but was unable to avoid playing a high-profile role due to the expectations of Mao, China's unpredictable political environment, and the manipulations of his wife and son, Ye Qun and Lin Liguo. After 1966, Lin, like Liu before him, attempted to build his own base of support so that he could better position himself for the inevitable, unpredictable political situation that would occur following the death of Mao. Lin's few proactive attempts to direct the Cultural Revolution were attempts to protect Red Guards and his political allies from political persecution, and to mediate the attempts of Jiang Qing and her followers to radicalize China's political climate. In May 1967, Lin's follower, Chen Boda, saved Zhou Enlai from being persecuted by Red Guards by convincing them that Zhou was Lin's follower and supporter. Zhou repaid Lin's assistance by giving him excessive public praise three months later, in August, but was forced to write a formal apology to Lin after Lin complained to Mao that such praise was inappropriate.

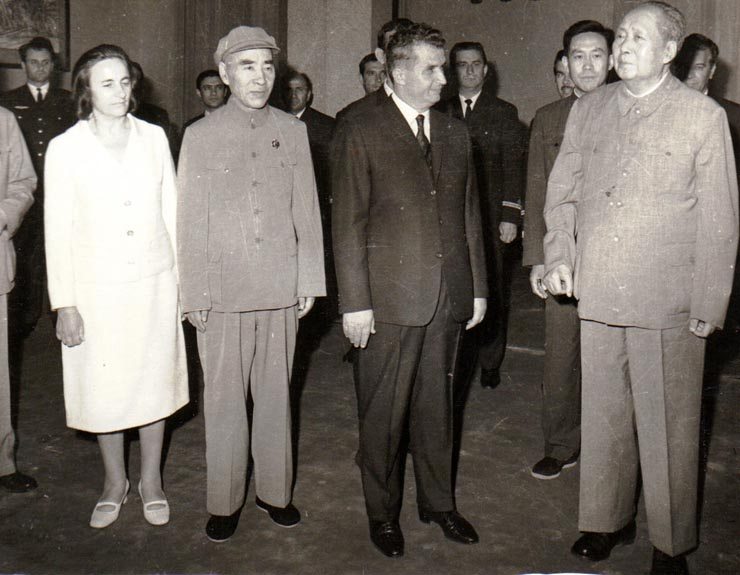
Lin (second from left) and Mao (far right) meeting with General Secretary of the Romanian Communist Party Nicolae Ceaușescu, during Ceaușescu's state visit to China (1971)

Lin and Jiang cooperated at the outset of the Cultural Revolution, but their relationship began to deteriorate in 1968 as Jiang frequently attempted to interfere in Chinese military affairs, which Lin found intolerable. By 1970 Lin and Ye were very unfriendly with Jiang Qing: Lin referred to her as a "long-nosed pit viper". From 1968 until his death in 1971, Lin and his supporters disagreed with Zhou Enlai and his followers over the issue of China's relationship with the United States and the Soviet Union. Lin believed that both superpowers were equally threatening to China, and that they were colluding to thwart China's interests. Zhou Enlai believed that China should become closer to the United States in order to mitigate the threat posed by the Soviet military. Lin was supported by Jiang Qing in his opposition to pursuing a relationship with the United States, but was not able to permanently disrupt Zhou's efforts to contact the American officials.

Lin Biao, as Defense Minister, was responsible for the Chinese response to the Zhenbao Island incident of March 1969, a battle with the Soviet Union over Damansky Island along the Amur River. Lin issued a report labeling the Soviet Union a "chauvinist" and "social imperialist" power, and issuing orders warning Chinese troops to be wary of an impending Soviet attack. Lin's followers attempted to use the hysteria generated by the incident in an effort to deepen the power that they had gained during the Cultural Revolution, disregarding and acting against the interests of Zhou Enlai and his supporters.

=== Height of power and eventual downfall ===
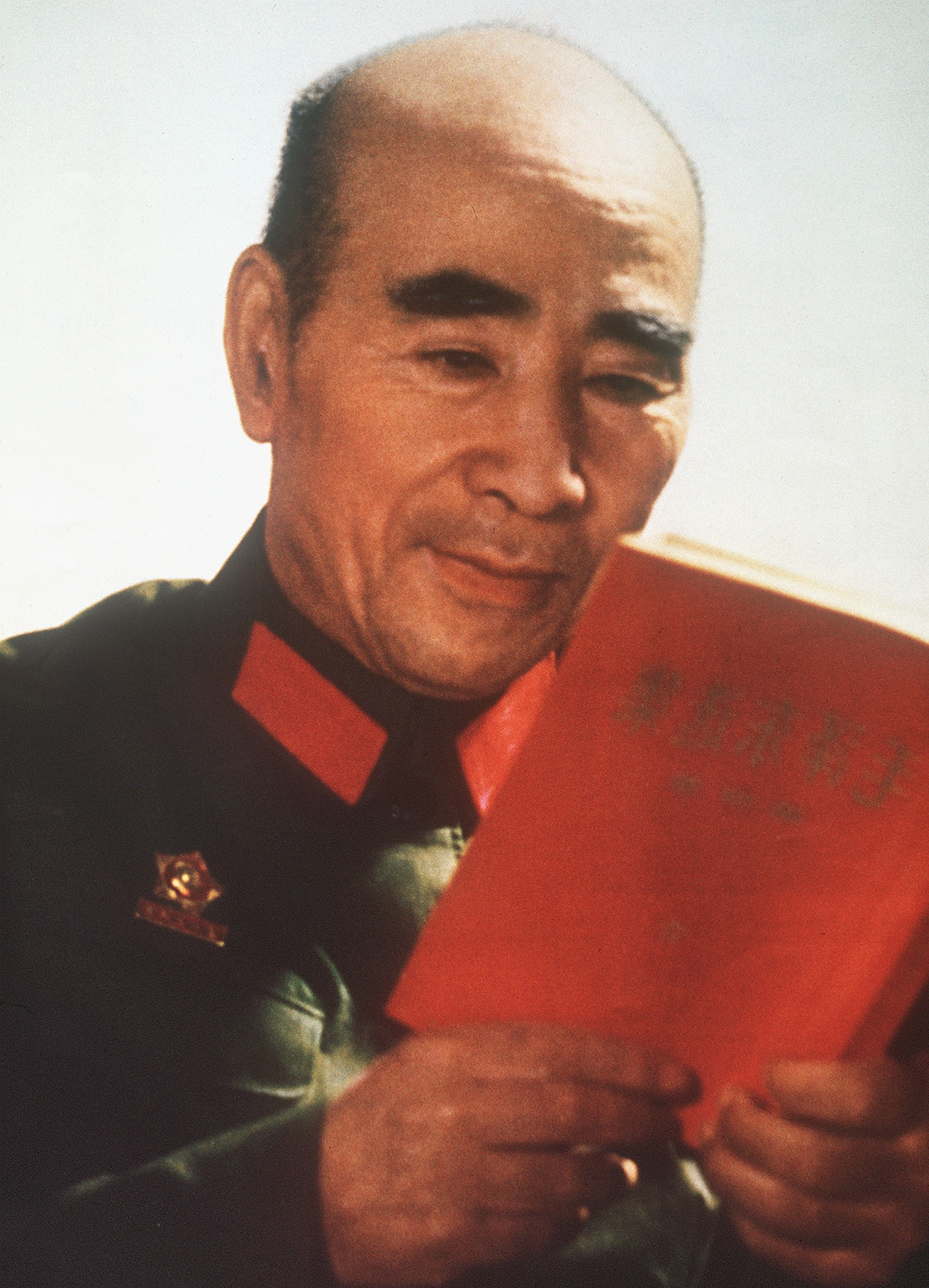
Lin Biao reading the Little Red Book. This is the last known photo of him ever taken (1971).

Lin officially became China's second-in-charge in April 1969, following the first plenary session of the 9th Central Committee of the Chinese Communist Party. Lin's position as Mao's "closest comrade-in-arms and successor" was recognized when the Party constitution was formally revised to reflect Lin's future succession. At the 9th Central Committee, Lin's faction was unquestionably dominant within the Politburo. Of the Politburo's twenty-one full members, Lin counted on the support of six members: the generals Huang Yongsheng, Wu Faxian, Li Zuopeng, Qiu Huizuo, his wife Ye Qun; and Chen Boda, an ambitious ideologue. Although they were not regarded as part of his faction, Lin would also reliably depend on the support of fellow Marshals Zhu De, Ye Jianying, Liu Bocheng, and Generals Chen Xilian, Xu Shiyou, and most crucially, Wang Dongxing, head of Mao's personal security, due to their combined mutual opposition to Jiang Qing. Lin's support surpassed the number of members aligned with Jiang Qing, and far surpassed those aligned with Zhou Enlai. Because over 45% of the Central Committee were members of the army, Lin's supporters dominated the Politburo, and Lin's power was second only to Mao's.

The group of Lin Biao-supporting military leaders known as the "Lin Biao clique" were at the forefront of expanding China's defense capacity. The Lin Biao clique sought to create major industrial complexes in China's hinterlands and therefore strongly supported the Third Front campaign. With the influence of the Lin Biao clique, the budgetary share of national defense during this period exceeded its share during the Korean War (40% for the former, compared to 33% for the latter). By 1971, China built enough subterranean civil defense infrastructure to shelter 60% of its urban population.

During the second plenary session of the 9th Central Committee, held in Lushan from August to September 1970, Mao became uncomfortable with Lin's growing power in the military, and began to maneuver against Lin by undermining his supporters and attacking some of Lin's suggestions at the conference, such as the inclusion of Mao's role as a "genius" in developing Marxism–Leninism into the new state constitution. Lin's supporters also attacked Zhang Chunqiao, a close Mao's ally for opposing such veneration. At the Second Plenum, Lin advocated that Chairman Mao take up the ceremonial position of President, which had not been filled in since the removal of Liu Shaoqi, but Mao dismissed this appeal, suspecting Lin of using it to increase his own power and kick him upstairs. Mao did not attack Lin directly, but showed his displeasure by attacking Lin's ally, Chen Boda, who was quickly disgraced. Lin kept his position, but the events of the Lushan Conference revealed a growing distrust between Lin and Mao.

Because Lin was one of the most influential figures in promoting Mao's personality cult, he began to be criticized within the Party for its excesses later in 1970. After 1970, some factions within the Army, and those led by Zhou Enlai and Jiang Qing, began to distance themselves from Lin. In order to limit Lin's growing power, Mao approved Zhou's efforts to rehabilitate a number of civilian officials who had been purged during the first years of the Cultural Revolution, and supported Zhou's efforts to improve China's relationship with the United States.

A serious rift developed between Mao and Lin. Mao was displeased with comments that Lin had made about his wife, Jiang Qing, at the Lushan Conference. Generals loyal to Lin refused to accept Mao's criticism of them, and Mao began to question whether Lin continued to follow him unconditionally. Mao wanted Lin to make a self-criticism, but Lin stayed away from Beijing and resisted doing so. Ye Qun made a self-criticism, but it was rejected by Mao as not genuine. Zhou Enlai attempted to mediate between Mao and Lin, but by 1971 Lin had become extremely reclusive and difficult to talk with at any level, and Zhou's mediation failed. In July 1971 Mao decided to remove Lin and his supporters. Zhou again attempted to moderate Mao's resolution to act against Lin, but failed.

== "Lin Biao incident" and death ==
Lin died when an aircraft carrying him and several members of his family crashed in Mongolia at 2:30 am on 13 September 1971, allegedly after attempting to assassinate Mao and defect to the Soviet Union. Following Lin's death, there has been widespread skepticism in the West concerning the official Chinese explanation, while forensic investigation conducted by the USSR (which recovered the bodies following the crash) has confirmed that Lin was among those who died in the crash.

The official narrative from the Chinese government is that Lin Biao had launched a failed coup against Mao, known as "Project 571". In Chinese, "5-7-1" (Chinese: 五七一; pinyin: wǔqīyī), is a homophone for "armed uprising" (Chinese: 武起义; pinyin: wǔqǐyì). After realizing it had failed, Lin Biao and associates attempted to flee to the Soviet Union and boarded a prearranged Trident 1-E (registered as CAAC B-256), piloted by Pan Jingyin, the deputy commander of the PLAAF 34th division. The aircraft did not take aboard enough fuel before taking off, ran out of fuel, and crashed near Öndörkhaan in Mongolia on 13 September 1971. Everyone on board, eight men and one woman, were killed.

An alternative theory posits that Lin Liguo, who was aware of the increasing hostility expressed towards his father in Mao's speeches, was the originator of the coup plan, which would involve an attack on Mao's train. Summarizing different narratives, journalist Jonathan Chatwin describes this as the most widely believed theory.

According to one account, Zhou Enlai asked Mao if Lin's plane should be shot down, and Mao replied, "Rain has to fall, girls have to marry, these things are immutable; let them go".

However, the exact circumstances surrounding Lin's death remain unclear, owing to a lack of surviving evidence. Many of the original government records relevant to Lin's death were destroyed. Because of the destruction of government documentation related to Lin's death, the Chinese government has relied on alleged confessions of purged officials close to Lin to corroborate the official narrative, but non-Chinese scholars generally regard these confessions as unreliable.

Ever since 1971, scholars outside of China have been skeptical of the government's official explanation of the circumstances surrounding Lin's death. Skeptics assert the official narrative does not sufficiently explain why Lin, one of Mao's closest supporters and one of the most successful Communist generals, would suddenly attempt a poorly planned, abortive coup. The government narrative also does not sufficiently explain how and why Lin's aircraft crashed. Skeptics have claimed Lin's decision to flee to the Soviet Union was illogical, on the grounds the United States or Taiwan would have been safer destinations. Western historians have contended Lin did not have either the intention or the ability to usurp Mao's place within the government or the Party. Chatwin notes that the coup's military naivety was inconsistent with Lin's astuteness in military matters. There are multiple theories that attempt to explain his flight and death.

The Chinese government has no interest in re-evaluating its narrative on Lin Biao's death. Non-Chinese scholars interpreted China's reluctance to consider contradictory evidence of its "official" history as the result of a desire to avoid exploring any issue that may lead to criticism of Mao Zedong or a re-evaluation of the Cultural Revolution in general, which may distract China from pursuing economic growth. The pilot of the plane, Pan Jingyin, was subsequently posthumously given the honorary title of “Revolutionary Martyr" by the Chinese government.

A six-month investigation by Western scholars in 1994 examined evidence in Russia, Mongolia, mainland China, the United States, and Taiwan, and came to a number of conclusions, some of which were contrary to the official Chinese version of events. The study confirmed Lin Biao, Ye Qun, and Lin Liguo were all killed in the crash. Lin's aircraft was travelling away from the Soviet Union at the time of its crash, making the exact sequence of events before Lin's death more confusing, and casting doubt on the possibility that Lin was attempting to seek asylum in the USSR. Lin's wife and son may have forced Lin to board the aircraft against his will. Several senior leaders within the Communist Party hierarchy knew Lin and his family would flee, but chose not to attempt to stop their flight. According to this study, Lin had attempted to contact the Kuomintang in Taiwan on two separate occasions shortly before his death.

In 1971, a Soviet forensic investigation was not able to determine the cause of the crash, but hypothesized the pilot misjudged his altitude while intentionally flying low to evade radar. Judging from the fires that burned after the crash, the Soviets estimated the aircraft had enough fuel to fly to the Soviet cities of Irkutsk or Chita. All of the work and its results were kept secret from the public: outside of the investigative team, only KGB chairman Yuri Andropov and Soviet leader Leonid Brezhnev were informed. The report remained classified until the early 1990s, after the end of the Cold War.

== Awards ==
Red Star Medal of the Chinese Soviet Republic (1st Class Medal) (1933)
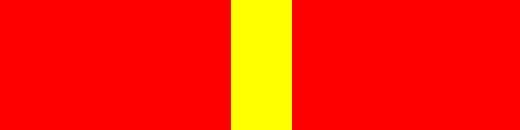
~~Order of 1 August (1st Class Medal) (1955)~~ (revoked in 1980)
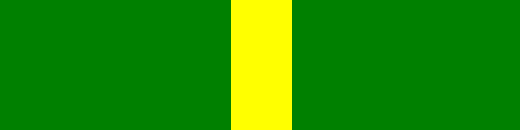
~~Order of Independence and Freedom (1st Class Medal)~~ (1955) (revoked in 1980)
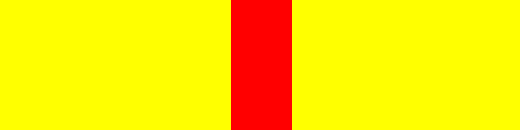
~~Order of Liberation (1st Class Medal)~~ (1955) (revoked in 1980)

== Legacy ==
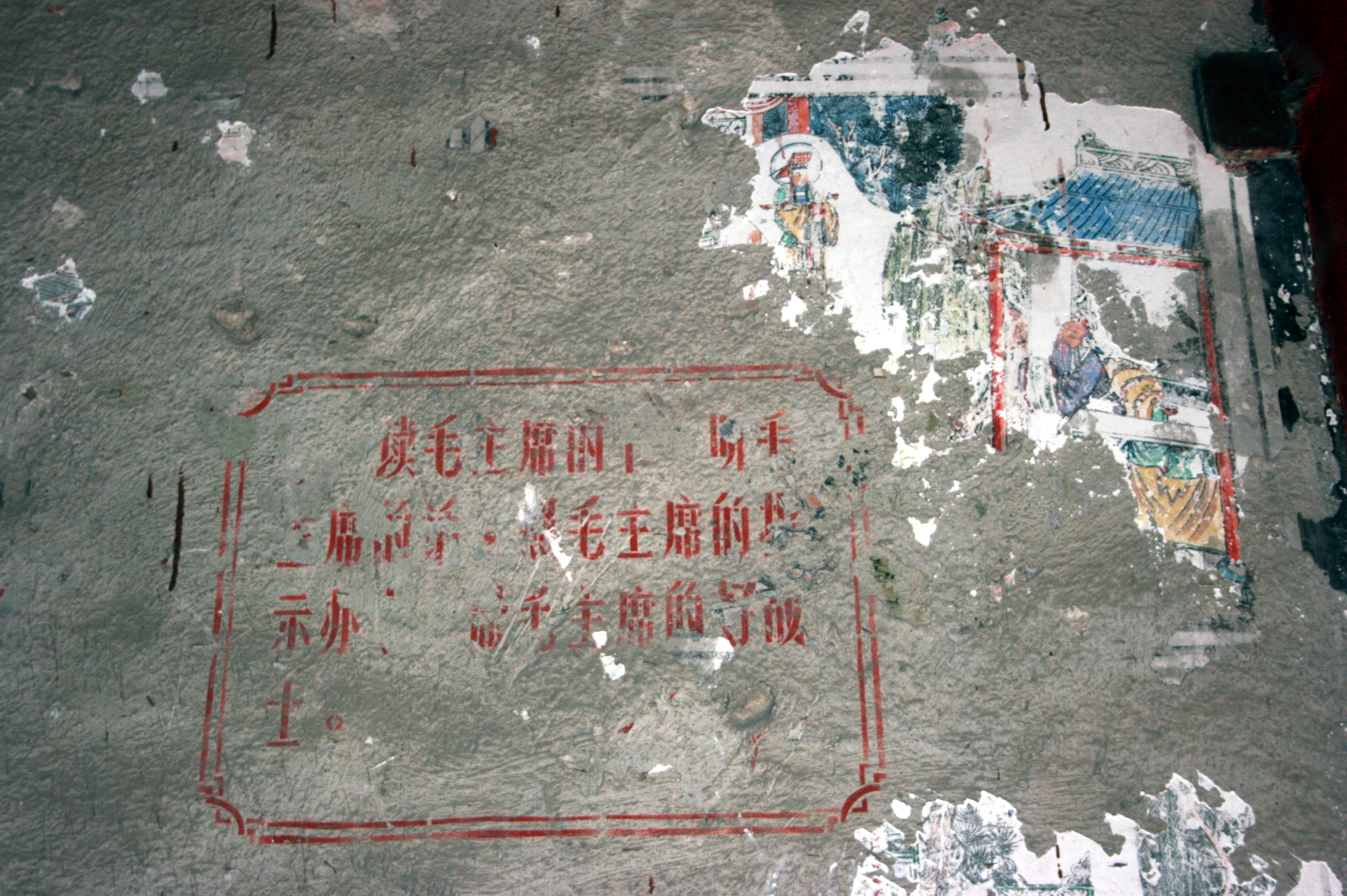
Graffiti with Lin Biao's foreword to Mao's Little Red Book. Lin's name (lower right) was later scratched out, presumably after his death.

Lin Biao was survived by Lin Liheng (also known as Doudou) and one other daughter. All military officials identified as being close to Lin or his family (most of China's high military command) were purged within weeks of Lin's disappearance. On 14 September, Zhou announced to the Politburo that four of the highest-ranking military officials in China were immediately suspended from duty and ordered to submit self-criticisms admitting their associations with Lin. This announcement was quickly followed by the arrest of ninety-three people suspected of being close to Lin, and within a month of Lin's disappearance over 1,000 senior Chinese military officials were purged. The official purge of Lin's supporters continued until it was closed by the 10th Central Committee in August 1973. The incident marked the end of the myth within the Party that Mao had always been absolutely correct. The National Day celebrations on 1 October 1971, were cancelled.

The news of Lin's death was announced to all Communist Party officials in mid-October 1971, and to the Chinese public in November. The news was publicly received with shock and confusion. Mao Zedong was especially disturbed by the incident: his health deteriorated, and he became depressed. At the end of 1971, he became seriously ill; he suffered a stroke in January 1972, received emergency medical treatment, and his health remained unstable. Mao became nostalgic about some of his revolutionary comrades whose purging Lin had supported, and backed Zhou Enlai's efforts to conduct a widespread rehabilitation of veteran revolutionaries, and to correct some of the excesses of the Cultural Revolution (which he blamed on Lin Biao). In the aftermath of the purge of Lin's supporters, Zhou Enlai replaced Lin as the second most powerful man in China, and Jiang Qing and her followers were never able to displace him. Without the support of Lin, Jiang was unable to prevent Zhou's efforts to improve China's relationship with the United States, or to rehabilitate cadres who had been purged during the Cultural Revolution. The clause in the Party constitution indicating that Lin was Mao's successor was not officially amended until the 10th Central Committee in August 1973.

The position of the Chinese government on Lin and the circumstances of his death changed several times over the decade following 1971. For over a year, the Party first attempted to cover up the details of Lin's death. The government then began to issue partial details of the event, followed by an anti-Lin Biao propaganda campaign. After Mao's death, in 1976, the government confirmed its condemnation of Lin and generally ceased any dialogue concerning Lin's place in history. Throughout the 1970s, high-ranking leaders of the Chinese Communist Party, including Hua Guofeng, spread the story to foreign delegates that Lin had conspired with the KGB to assassinate Mao.

In 1973 Jiang Qing, Mao's fourth wife and a former political ally of Lin's, started the Criticize Lin, Criticize Confucius campaign, aimed at using Lin's scarred image to attack Zhou Enlai. Much of this propaganda campaign involved the creative falsification of history, including (false) details about how Lin had opposed Mao's leadership and tactics throughout his career. Lin's name became involved in Jiang's propaganda campaign after flashcards, made by Ye Qun to record Lin's thoughts, were discovered in Lin's residence following his death. Some of these flashcards recorded opinions critical of Mao. According to Lin's writings, Mao "will fabricate 'your' opinion first, then he will change 'your' opinion – which is not actually yours, but his fabrication. I should be careful of this standard trick." Another critical comment of Lin's states that Mao "worships himself and has a blind faith in himself. He worships himself to such an extent that all accomplishments are attributed to him, but all mistakes are made by others". Lin's private criticisms of Mao were directly contradictory of the public image cultivated by Lin, who publicly stated following the Great Leap Forward that all mistakes of the past were the result of deviating from Mao's instructions.

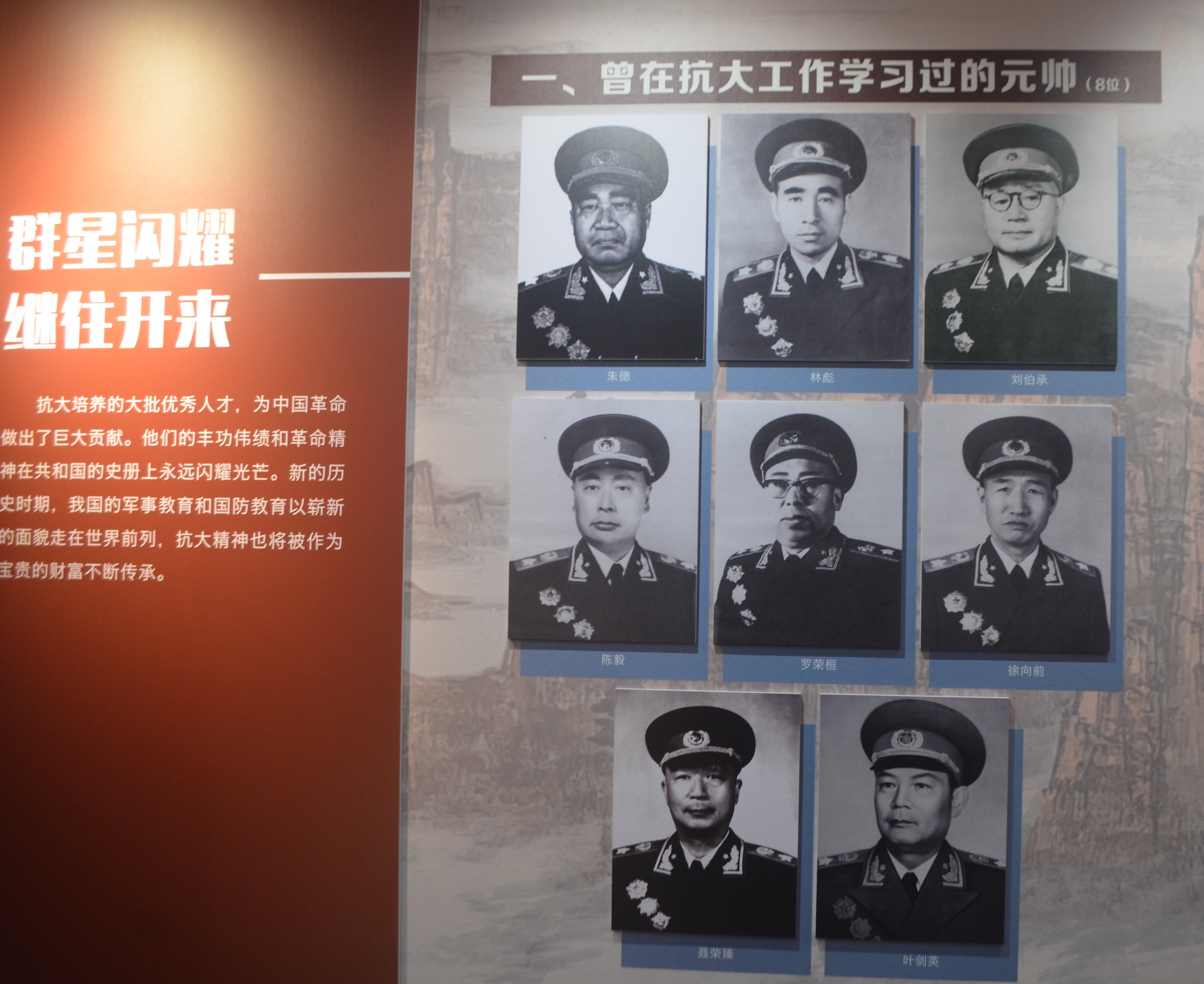
Lin featured among seven other Marshals who are alumni of the Counter-Japanese Military and Political University and are recognised for their contributions to the Chinese Communist Revolution, at an exhibit in the Whampoa Military Academy Memorial Hall in Guangzhou (2026)

Like many major proponents of the Cultural Revolution, Lin's image was manipulated after Mao's death in 1976, and many negative aspects of the Cultural Revolution were blamed on Lin. After October 1976, those in power also blamed Mao's supporters, the so-called Gang of Four. In 1980, the Chinese government held a series of "special trials" to identify those most responsible for the Cultural Revolution. In 1981, the government released their verdict: that Lin Biao must be held, along with Jiang Qing, as one of the two major "counter-revolutionary cliques" responsible for the excesses of the late 1960s. According to the official Party verdict, Lin and Jiang were singled out for blame because they led intra-Party cliques which took advantage of Mao's "mistakes" to advance their own political goals, engaging in "criminal activity" for their own self-benefit. Among the "crimes" he was charged with was the ouster of China's head of state, President Liu Shaoqi. Lin was found to be primarily responsible for using "false evidence" to orchestrate a "political frame-up" of Liu. Lin has been officially remembered as one of the greatest villains of modern China since then. Lin was never politically rehabilitated, so the charges against him continue to stand.

For several decades, Lin's name and image were censored within China, but in recent years a balanced image of Lin has reappeared in popular culture: surviving aides and family members have published memoirs about their experience with Lin; scholars have explored most surviving evidence relevant to his life and death, and have gained exposure within the official Chinese media; movies set before 1949 have made reference to Lin; and Lin's name has re-appeared in Chinese history textbooks, recognizing his contributions to the victory of the Red Army. Within modern China, Lin is regarded as one of the Red Army's best military strategists. In 2007, a big portrait of Lin was added to the Chinese Military Museum in Beijing, included in a display of the "Ten Marshals", a group considered to be the founders of China's armed forces.

== See also ==
- People's Liberation Army
- List of officers of the People's Liberation Army
- 9th Politburo of the Chinese Communist Party
- Ye Qun
- Huang Yongsheng
- Li Zuopeng
- Wu Faxian
- Qiu Huizuo
- Chen Boda

== Sources ==
- Barnouin, Barbara and Yu Changgen. Zhou Enlai: A Political Life. Hong Kong: Chinese University of Hong Kong, 2006. ISBN 962-996-280-2. Retrieved on 12 March 2011.
- Chang, Jung and Halliday, Jon. Mao: The Unknown Story. Knopf. 2005. ISBN 0-679-42271-4.
- China at War: An Encyclopedia. Ed. Li Xiaobing. United States: ABC-CLIO. 2012. ISBN 978-1-59884-415-3. Retrieved 22 May 2012.
- Dmitriev, Iurii. "Poslednii Polet Kitaiskogo Marshala" [The Last Flight of the Chinese Marshal] (in Russian). Trud. 9 April 1994.
- Domes, Jurgen. Peng Te-huai: The Man and the Image, London: C. Hurst & Company. 1985. ISBN 0-905838-99-8.
- Ebrey, Patricia Buckley. (Ed.) Chinese Civilization: A Sourcebook. 2nd ed. United States: The Free Press. 1993. ISBN 0-02-908752-X.
- Frankel, Benjamin. The Cold War 1945–1991. Vol. 2, Leaders and other important figures in the Soviet Union, Eastern Europe, China and the Third World (1992) pp. 192–95.
- Han, Oliver Lei. "Sources and Early Printing History of Chairman Mao's 'Quotations'" Archived 7 November 2014 at the Wayback Machine. The Bibliographical Society of America. 10 January 2004. Retrieved 9 December 2011.
- Hannam, Peter, and Lawrence, Susan V. "Solving a Chinese Puzzle: Lin Biao's Final Days and Death, After Two Decades of Intrigue". U.S. News & World Report. 23 January 1994. Retrieved 21 November 2011.
- He, Henry Yuhuai. Dictionary of the Political Thought of the People's Republic of China. United States: East Gate. 2001. ISBN 0-7656-0569-4.
- Hu Chi-hsi. "Mao, Lin Biao, and the Fifth Encirclement Campaign". The China Quarterly. No. 82. June 1980.
- Hu Xingdou. "Ethnic Problems: The Truth About Lin Biao" (in Chinese). The China Military Network. 6 June 2005.
- Ivavniuk, Ivan. "Marshal Lin' Biao Razbilsia v Mongolii" [Marshal Lin Biao Crashed in Mongolia] (in Russian). Krasnaia Zvezda. 7 May 1994.
- Kozyrev, Andrei. "Delo Lin Biao: Zagadka Pochti Razreshena" [The Lin Biao affair: the mystery is almost solved] (in Russian). Moskovskaya Pravda. 24 March 1994.
- Lazitch, Branko and Drachkovitch, Milorad M. Biographical Dictionary of the Comintern: New, Revised, and Expanded Ed. Stanford, CA: Hoover Institution Press. 1986.
- Lee, Khoon Choy. Pioneers of Modern China: Understanding the Inscrutable Chinese. Singapore: World Scientific Publishing. 2005. ISBN 981-256-464-0.
- Leung, Edward Pak-wah. Historical Dictionary of the Chinese Civil War. United States: Scarecrow Press. 2002. ISBN 0-8108-4435-4.
- Lew, Christopher R. The Third Chinese Revolutionary War, 1945–1949: An Analysis of Communist Strategy and Leadership. US and Canada: Routledge. 2009. ISBN 0-415-77730-5.
- Lin Biao. "Lin Piao: Master Strategist". In Snow, Helen Foster (Ed.). The Chinese Communists: Sketches and Autobiographies of the Old Guard. Westport, Connecticut: Greenwoods Publishing Company. 1972. ISBN 0-8371-6321-8
- Luna, Adrian., 'Bringing the Inside Out: Health, Personality, Politics, and the Tragedy of Lin Biao.' VDM Verlag, January 2008. ISBN 978-3836435871
- North, Robert C., ed. "Liu Shaoqi". Encyclopædia Britannica. 16 August 2013. Retrieved 28 June 2014.
- Mackerras, Colin, Donald Hugh McMillen, and Donal Andrew Watson. Dictionary of the Politics of the People's Republic of China. Great Britain: Routelage. 1998. ISBN 0-415-15450-2. Retrieved 9 November 2011.
- Pacepa, Ion Mihai. "The Kremlin's Killing Ways" National Review Online. 28 November 2006. Retrieved 21 January 2012.
- Qiu Jin. The Culture of Power: The Lin Biao Incident in the Cultural Revolution. Stanford, California: Stanford University Press. 1999. Retrieved 12 November 2011.
- Qiu Jin. "Distorting History: Lessons From The Lin Biao Incident". Quest. Vol. 3, Issue 2, June 2002. Retrieved 18 November 2011.
- Robinson, Thomas W. "The Tragedy of Lin Biao: Riding the Tiger during the Cultural Revolution 1966–1971 by Frederick C. Teiwes, Warren Sun". The China Quarterly. No.160. December 1999. pp. 1080–1082.
- Ross, Robert S. "From Lin Biao to Deng Xiaoping: Elite Instability and China's U. S. Policy". The China Quarterly. No.118. June 1989. pp. 265–299.
- Salisbury, Harrison E. The Long March: The Untold Story. New York: Harper & Row. 1985.
- Snow, Edgar. Red Star Over China. Penguin. 1972. ISBN 0-14-021433-X.
- Tanner, Harold Miles. China: A History. Indianapolis, Indiana: Hackett Publishing Company. 2009. ISBN 978-0-87220-915-2.
- Tanner, Harold M. The Battle for Manchuria and the Fate of China: Siping 1946. Bloomington & Indianapolis: Indiana University Press. 2013.
- Teiwes, Frederick C., and Sun, Warren. The Tragedy of Lin Biao: Riding the Tiger During the Cultural Revolution. North America: University of Hawaii Press. 1996. ISBN 0-8248-1811-3.
- Uhalley Jr., Stephen, and Qiu Jin. "The Lin Biao Incident: More Than Twenty Years Later". Pacific Affairs. Vol. 66, No. 3, Autumn, 1993. pp. 386–398.
- Yang Jisheng. "The Fatal Politics of the PRC's Great Leap Famine: the preface to Tombstone". Journal of Contemporary China. Vol.19, Issue 66. pp. 755–776. 26 July 2010.
- Yao Ming-Le. "The Conspiracy and Death of Lin Biao: How Mao's Successor Plotted and Failed- An Inside Account of the Most Bizarre and Mysterious Event in the History of Modern China". Alfred A. Knopf. 1983. ISBN 978-0-39452-543-3.
- Zhang Langlang. "Sun Weishi's Story" (in Chinese). The Collected Works of Zhang Langlang. Boxun News Network. Retrieved on 19 November 2011.

Government offices
Preceded by Marshal Peng Dehuai	Minister of National Defense; 1959–1971	Succeeded by Marshal Ye Jianying
Preceded by Chen Yun	First-ranked Vice Premier of China; 1965–1971	Succeeded by Deng Xiaoping
Party political offices
Preceded by Liu Shaoqi; Zhou Enlai; Zhu De; Chen Yun	Vice Chairman of the Chinese Communist Party; 1958–1971; Served alongside: (until 1966) Liu Shaoqi, Zhou Enlai, Zhu De, Chen Yun	Succeeded by Zhou Enlai; Kang Sheng; Li Desheng; Wang Hongwen; Ye Jianying
