= Wu Faxian =

Chinese military leader (1915–2004)

Lieutenant General Wu Faxian
- 吴法宪
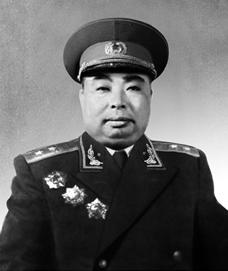
- Wu Faxian in 1955

2nd Commander of the People's Liberation Army Air Force
- In office May 1965 – September 1971
- Preceded by: Liu Yalou
- Succeeded by: Ma Ning (vacant until 1973)

2nd Political Commissar of the PLA Air Force
- In office 1957–1965
- Preceded by: Xiao Hua
- Succeeded by: Yu Lijin

Personal details
- Born: 25 August 1915 Yongfeng County, Jiangxi, China
- Died: 17 October 2004 (aged 89) Jinan, Shandong, China
- Party: Chinese Communist Party

Military service
- Allegiance: China
- Branch/service: Chinese Red Army People's Liberation Army Ground Force; People's Liberation Army Air Force
- Years of service: 1930–1971
- Rank: Lieutenant General
- Battles/wars: Second Sino-Japanese War; Chinese Civil War

Wu Faxian (Chinese: 吴法宪; 25 August 1915 - 17 October 2004) was a Chinese Communist revolutionary and lieutenant general of the People's Liberation Army. In 1930 he became a soldier of Chinese Red Army, two years later he joined the Chinese Communist Party. He participated in five Counter-Encirclement Campaigns, Long March, Battle of Pingxingguan, Liaoshen Campaign and Pingjin Campaign.

In 1955 he was granted the military rank of lieutenant general. Wu was a subordinate of Lin Biao, in 1965 he became the commander of People's Liberation Army Air Force (PLAAF). After the failed coup by Lin Biao supporters, Wu was imprisoned as part of the post-Lin purges. In 1973, he was stripped of all titles and Party membership. In 1981 he was declared guilty as a member of the Lin Biao group and sentenced to 17 years in prison. However, due to good behavior and his past meritorious service, as well as ailing health, he was released later the same year when he was given a house, car and a monthly pension as his party membership and titles were restored. He was given a state funeral when he died in 2004 which was attended by many former subordinates as well as representatives from the PLA.

During the Cultural Revolution, Wu's closeness with Lin Biao resulted in suspicions among Chinese leadership as to the political loyalties of the PLAAF.
