= Lin Liheng =

Daughter of Chinese marshal Lin Biao (born 1944)

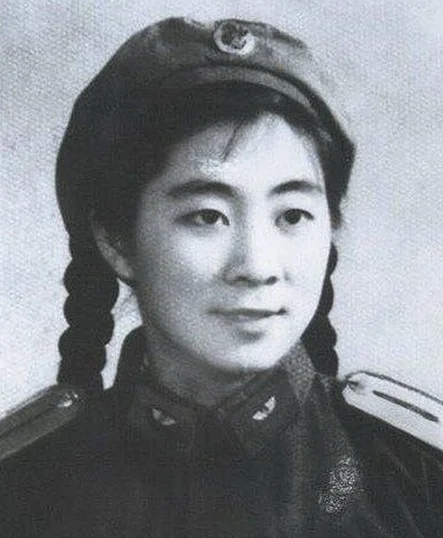
- Lin in military uniform, c. 1960s

Personal details
- Born: 31 August 1944 (age 82) Yan'an, Shaanxi, China
- Party: Chinese Communist Party
- Spouse: Zhang Qinglin (m. 1974; died 2022)
- Relations: Lin Liguo (brother)
- Parent(s): Lin Biao and Ye Qun
- Education: Tsinghua University; Peking University

Military service
- Allegiance: People's Republic of China
- Branch/service: People's Liberation Army Air Force

Chinese name
- Chinese: 林立衡
Transcriptions
Standard Mandarin
- Hanyu Pinyin: Lín Lìhéng
- Wade–Giles: Lin^{2} Li^{4}-heng^{2}

Nickname
- Chinese: 林豆豆
- Literal meaning: Bean Bean Lin
Transcriptions
Standard Mandarin
- Hanyu Pinyin: Lín Dòudòu
- Wade–Giles: Lin^{2} Tou^{4}-tou^{4}

Lin Liheng (Chinese: 林立衡; born 31 August 1944), commonly known by her nickname Lin Doudou (Chinese: 林豆豆), is the daughter of Chinese marshal Lin Biao and his second wife Ye Qun. As the child of a prominent Chinese military and political leader, Lin was given minor but important positions during her youth. During the Cultural Revolution, she served as the deputy editor-in-chief of the newspaper of the People's Liberation Army Air Force. However, following her father's death and subsequent denouncement by the Chinese Communist Party (CCP) in 1971, Lin was stripped of her positions and detained indefinitely.

Lin's health deteriorated during her detainment and interrogation, especially during the Gang of Four's "Criticize Lin, Criticize Confucius" campaign. She was released in 1974 on the personal orders of then CCP chairman Mao Zedong. A year later, Deng Xiaoping, who would eventually succeed Mao as China's paramount leader, gave Lin a minor position in a factory in Zhengzhou, Henan. However, she lost her position in the aftermath of the Gang of Four's "Criticize Deng" campaign. Lin was rehabilitated in the mid-1980s by then CCP general secretary Zhao Ziyang, who allowed Lin to return to Beijing after receiving a letter of appeal from her.

Lin kept a low profile in Beijing as a contributor to the Chinese Academy of Social Sciences and retired in 2002. After her retirement she opened a restaurant in Beijing, and has since spoken at a few public events.

== Early life ==
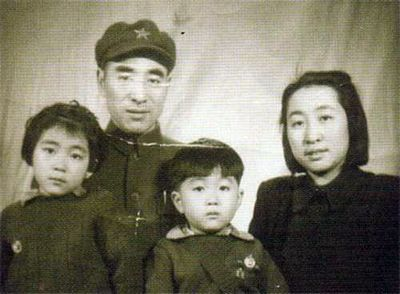
Lin with her family, some time in the late 1940s

Lin Liheng was born in Central Hospital in Yan'an, Shaanxi. In 1962, she joined the Chinese Communist Youth League and was admitted to the Department of Electronic Engineering of Tsinghua University. However, she was soon transferred to the Chinese Department of Peking University due to health complications. In 1965, she joined the Chinese Communist Party (CCP).

== Cultural Revolution ==
Lin was the deputy editor-in-chief of the newspaper of the People's Liberation Army Air Force during the Cultural Revolution.

Lin opposed Project 571, an alleged plan by her brother Lin Liguo to depose then CCP chairman and Chinese paramount leader Mao Zedong. On 7 September 1971, Liguo confided to Liheng his discovery that Mao had made critical remarks about their father and presented three possible courses of action. The Lin family were to either assassinate Mao, fly to Guangzhou where they could establish an alternate central committee in opposition to the central authorities in Beijing, or flee to the Soviet Union. Liheng rejected all of her brother's proposals and suggested that their father resign from all his positions like Zhu De to avoid trouble. Liguo rebuked the suggestion, believing that their father would be detained and die in custody due to his waning health. After the conversation, Liheng immediately contacted the leaders of PLA unit 8341, the unit responsible for her father's security. She tried unsuccessfully to convince them that her brother and mother were planning to pressure her father into leaving China for an unknown destination, against his wishes.

On 13 September 1971, Lin's father, mother, and brother died in a plane crash in Mongolia; Lin was detained and investigated by the Chinese authorities, even though she had informed Chinese premier Zhou Enlai of her family's flight the evening prior. In March 1974, the Criticize Lin, Criticize Confucius campaign was started by the Gang of Four, which labelled Lin as "the nail left by Lin Biao". She attempted suicide by taking sleeping pills but was rushed to an air force hospital and survived. Over the course of her detainment and interrogation, Lin lost half of her hair and six of her teeth. She was released on 31 July 1974 on Mao's personal orders.

== After the Cultural Revolution ==
In October 1975, then Chief of the General Staff of the People's Liberation Army Deng Xiaoping proposed to transfer Lin from the military to local civilian work. Lin made a failed request to return to Beijing and was sent to work in an automobile factory in Zhengzhou, Henan, as a section-level cadre-deputy director of the factory's revolution committee. During her time in Zhengzhou, her movements were often restricted by the Chinese Ministry of Public Security. Following the Gang of Four's "Criticize Deng" campaign in 1976, Lin was stripped of her position and downgraded to a factory worker. Sometime afterwards, she broke the phalanx bone in her right foot in a workplace accident. In 1984, she was admitted to a hospital after suffering severe allergic reactions to pesticides being produced at a factory near her home.

In the mid-1980s, Lin wrote a letter of appeal to then CCP general secretary Zhao Ziyang. With the help of Zeng Zhi, the wife of her father's old subordinate Tao Zhu and the then deputy head of the Organization Department of the CCP Central Committee, her letter of appeal was received by Zhao. Soon after, Zhao ordered Lin to be rehabilitated and she was allowed to return to Beijing.

Upon arriving in Beijing, she began working for the Chinese Academy of Social Sciences and changed her name to avoid public attention. She was a co-founder of the Chinese Modern Culture Association in 1989. She retired in 2002.

== Later life ==
With money donated from her hometown of Huanggang, Hubei, Lin opened a restaurant in Beijing after her retirement and served as its general manager. The restaurant managed to attract a large number of diners from home and abroad.

In 2009, the Museum of the War of Chinese People's Resistance Against Japanese Aggression welcomed more than 80 children of the founding generals to celebrate the founding of People's Republic of China; Lin was among the invited. In 2011, during the Mid-Autumn Festival, Lin and her husband led an entourage to Öndörkhaan, Mongolia, where her father's plane crashed four decades prior, for a memorial service in honour of him. On 1 November 2014, she attended a symposium of Chinese Red Army descendants and gave a speech asking for further investigations into incidents covered up during the Cultural Revolution, including the death of her father.
