= Lin Liguo =

Son of Chinese marshal Lin Biao (1945–1971)

- 林立果
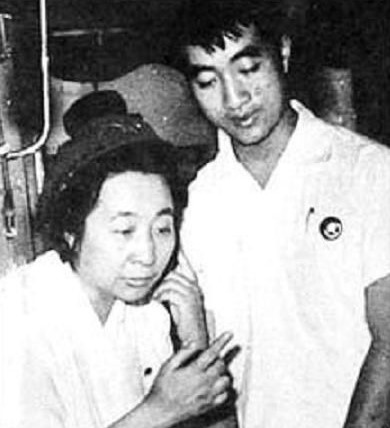
- Lin Liguo, right, with his mother Ye Qun

Personal details
- Born: 23 December 1945 Harbin, Heilongjiang, Soviet-occupied Manchuria
- Died: 13 September 1971 (aged 25) Öndörkhaan, Mongolia
- Party: Chinese Communist Party
- Relations: Lin Liheng (sister)
- Parent(s): Lin Biao and Ye Qun
- Education: Beijing No.4 High School; Peking University

Military service
- Allegiance: People's Republic of China
- Branch/service: People's Liberation Army Air Force

Chinese name
- Chinese: 林立果
Transcriptions
Standard Mandarin
- Hanyu Pinyin: Lín Lìguǒ
- Wade–Giles: Lin^{2} Li^{4}-kuo^{3}

Lin Liguo (Chinese: 林立果; 23 December 1945 – 13 September 1971) was the son of Chinese marshal Lin Biao. He was the alleged leader of Project 571, a coup plot against Chinese Communist Party chairman Mao Zedong. An officer in the People's Liberation Army Air Force, he rose rapidly with the backing of its commander, Wu Faxian, and was given unusual authority over the service. He died with his parents when their aircraft crashed in Mongolia on 13 September 1971, in what became known as the Lin Biao incident.

== Early life and education ==
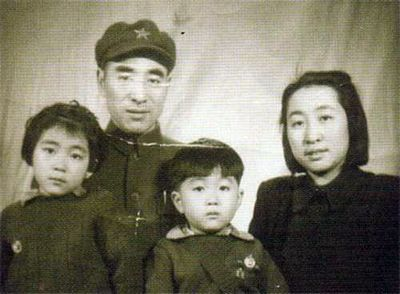
Lin Liguo (centre) with his family

Lin Liguo was the son of Lin Biao and his wife, Ye Qun. He studied in the physics department of Peking University.

== Air Force career ==
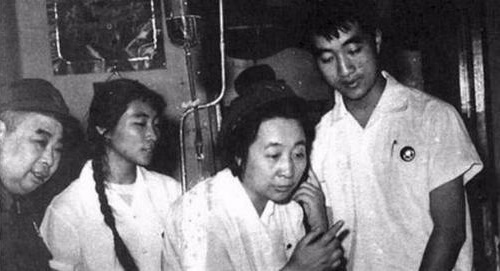
Lin Liguo (right) with his mother Ye Qun (second from right)

Following the start of the Cultural Revolution, Lin left the university and joined the People's Liberation Army Air Force (PLAAF) in 1967, at the age of 23, under the alias Li Guo. Wu Faxian made him a secretary in the office of the Air Force headquarters, and assigned the officer Zhou Yuchi to him as his mentor. A few months after he joined the air force, Wu and Zhou sponsored his admission to the Chinese Communist Party.

In early October 1969, Ye Qun raised the question of a post for her son with Wu Faxian. On 17 October 1969, an order signed by Wu and the Air Force political commissar Wang Huiqiu appointed Lin deputy director of the Air Force Headquarters Office and deputy head of its Operations Department. Wu then told the service that everything in the air force was to be reported to Lin and that he could command and mobilise everything, a formula that became known as the "two everythings". Junior officers joked that he had become a soldier in one year, a party member in two and a deputy department head in three. Wu later said that Lin Biao had apparently not known about the appointment, which Ye Qun and Lin Liguo had arranged behind his back, a point Wu said he learned from Lin Liheng in 1989.

On 31 July 1970, Wu had Lin give a speech on his study of Mao's thought to senior officers of the Air Force headquarters. Wu praised the speech extravagantly, saying that it had "launched a political satellite", and had earlier described Lin as a "super genius". According to Wu Faxian's testimony in the 1980 trial:

"In fact, all the things the Air Force reported since July 6, 1970 were to Liguo. After all the things we had to deal with, was to listen to his orders."

In May 1971, Lin and Zhou Yuchi used Lin Biao's name to press Wu into letting them learn to fly the Yunque helicopter.

According to Zhang Ning, his former fiancée, Lin Liguo was a fan of the Beatles, and his position gave him access to Western rock music, books and television fashion shows that were banned in China at the time. The writer Linda Jaivin notes that he enjoys a kind of cult status among Chinese rock musicians for having liked the Beatles. A story recounted in a book by the cultural critic Zhu Dake holds that in 1970 the future rock singer Cui Jian, then a boy, heard Lin play and sing the Beatles' "Let It Be" on the guitar at an air force compound. Cui has denied that the meeting took place, and the Italian magazine China Files describes the story as a romantic but probably unrealistic legend.

== Joint Fleet and Project 571 ==
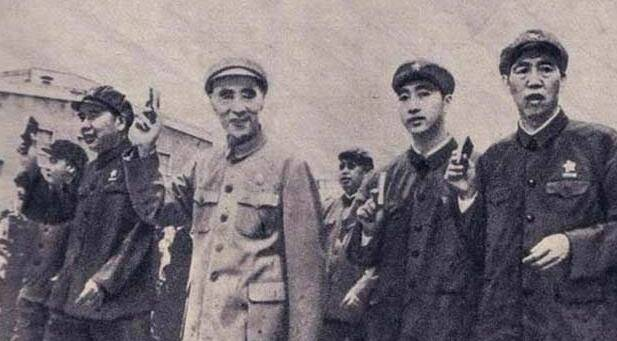
Lin Liguo (second from right) and his father Lin Biao (centre)

Within the air force, Lin secretly organised a group of followers that became known as the "Joint Fleet". According to the official account, in March 1971 he led the drafting of the "Outline of Project 571", which called for killing Mao and setting up a new central leadership. The code name was a homophone of the Chinese words for "armed uprising". The historians Frederick Teiwes and Warren Sun note that the document released in 1972 was based on confessions by Lin's collaborators, and that the "571" label came from a scrap of paper bearing the circled number, found among the belongings of one of his accomplices.

The party later accused Lin Liguo of conspiring with his parents to kill Mao during Mao's tour of southern China in August and September 1971. The main evidence was a summary note written by one of Lin's air force subordinates, which referred to Mao by the code name "B-52", and many experts now question whether it was falsified. The historian James Carter writes that the alleged plans ranged from blowing up Mao's train and ambushing his motorcade to using a lone gunman or bombing Zhongnanhai from the air, and that their details often stretch credulity. Unlike the official narrative of the events leading to the Lin Biao incident, the most widely believed version posits that Lin Liguo, who was aware of the increasing hostility expressed towards his father in Mao's speeches, was the originator of the coup plan.

== Flight and death ==
Late on 12 September 1971, Lin flew on Trident No. 256 from Beijing to Beidaihe, where his father was staying. That night, Lin Biao's daughter, Lin Liheng, reported her family's plans to Zhou Enlai a few hours before the flight, which according to the researcher Yu Ruxin pushed the family to flee quickly. Lin Liguo's former fiancée, Zhang Ning, who was at the Beidaihe compound that night, later described the family's frantic drive to the airport. She said that Lin Liguo and his mother feared an imminent purge by Mao, and that they took Lin Biao, who was drowsy from medication, to the waiting plane. Lin Liheng has claimed that her father had been drugged with sleeping pills and taken aboard by her mother and brother, but Yu Ruxin rejects this and argues that Lin Biao prepared the defection with his family.

The Lin family, including Lin Biao, Ye Qun, and Lin Liguo, attempted to flee after the coup failed. On 13 September 1971, they fled in a PLAAF Hawker Siddeley Trident, from Qinhuangdao Shanhaiguan Airport. The aircraft took off without authorisation at 0:32 am. It crashed near Öndörkhaan in eastern Mongolia at about 2:25 am, killing all nine people on board, including Lin Biao, Ye Qun, Lin Liguo and six subordinates. Lin Liguo was 25 years old. Shortly after the Trident's departure, Zhou Yuchi, Yu Xinye and Li Weixin seized a helicopter at Shahe airfield near Beijing and flew north, but the pilots turned back and landed near Huairou, where Zhou and Yu shot themselves and Li was captured.

Party documents later released state:

"the plane was making for the Soviet Union but was inadequately fueled for such a trip; it also had on board neither navigator nor radio operator. It crashed in Mongolia on September 13, 1971, burning to death all on board."

However, according to the historian J. D. Spence, "this story is essentially beyond verification, since the photographs later released by the Chinese authorities are of dubious authenticity and details on Lin Biao’s exact plans and on the other plotters are blurred". The government narrative also does not sufficiently explain how and why Lin Biao's plane crashed. Skeptics have claimed that Lin's decision to flee to the Soviet Union was illogical, on the grounds that the United States or Taiwan would have been safer destinations. A Mongolian intelligence report, compiled with Soviet military experts and completed on 20 November 1971, attributed the crash to pilot error and recorded that the wreck burned for a long time, which suggested that the plane had plenty of fuel.

The only identification found at the crash site was that of Lin Liguo. A KGB team later exhumed the bodies twice, and its investigators concluded that Lin Biao and Ye Qun had died in the crash. According to a KGB file reported in 1994, Soviet autopsies at the site found that Lin Biao, his wife and his son had all been killed in the crash.

== Trial and assessments ==
The trial of the leaders of the "counter-revolutionary" cliques of Lin Biao and the Gang of Four was held in Beijing from 20 November 1980 to 25 January 1981. Its ten defendants included five former senior military officers, Huang Yongsheng, Wu Faxian, Li Zuopeng, Qiu Huizuo and Jiang Tengjiao. The Chinese authorities alleged that Lin Liguo had been one of the principal authors of the plot against Mao.

Whether Lin Biao himself planned a coup, or whether Lin Liguo and Ye Qun made such plans without telling him, remains unclear. Teiwes and Sun suggest that Lin Liguo organised the coup and assassination projects without his father's knowledge. Carter notes that the historians Qiu Jin and Yang Jisheng both conclude that Lin Liguo acted without his father's direction and probably without his knowledge, and that Lin Biao agreed to flee only once he was told that the plan had failed.
