= Lin Biao incident =

1971 aircraft crash in Mongolia

Occurrence
- Date: 13 September 1971
- Summary: Cause disputed: Fuel starvation (Chinese government); Controlled flight into terrain, possibly due to pilot error (Soviet medical experts)
- Site: Near Öndörkhaan, Mongolian People's Republic; 47.7°N 111.25°E

Aircraft
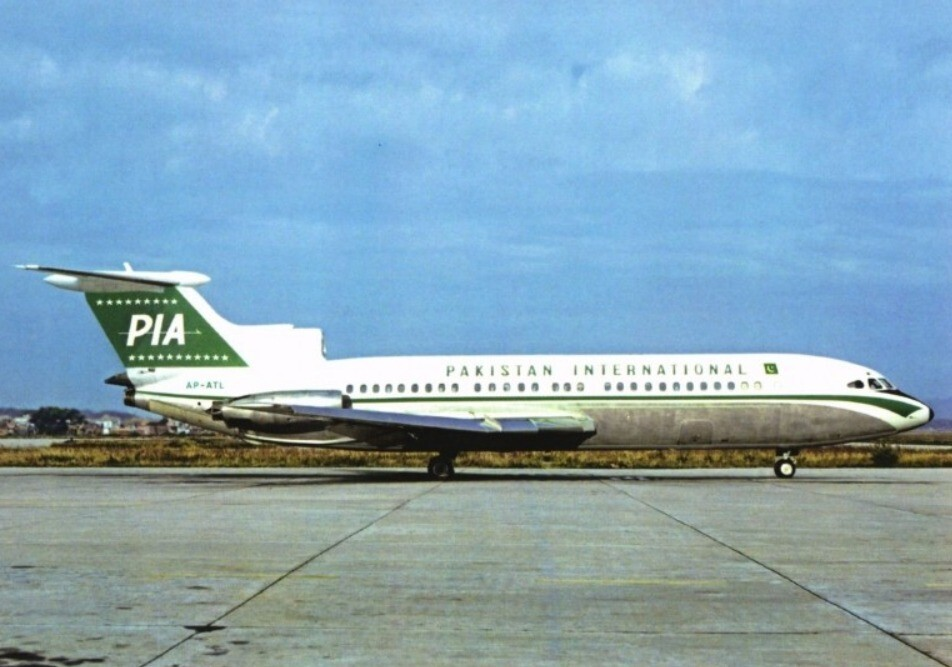
- The aircraft involved in the accident, while it was still in service with Pakistan International Airlines in 1967
- Aircraft type: Hawker Siddeley HS-121 Trident 1E
- Operator: People's Liberation Army Air Force
- Registration: B-256
- Flight origin: Qinhuangdao Shanhaiguan Airport, Hebei, China
- Destination: Soviet Union
- Occupants: 9
- Passengers: 5
- Crew: 4
- Fatalities: 9
- Survivors: 0

On 13 September 1971, the aircraft transporting Lin Biao, the sole vice chairman of the Chinese Communist Party, crashed near Öndörkhaan, Mongolia. Lin and several members of his family were travelling on board a Hawker Siddeley Trident jetliner of the People's Liberation Army Air Force (PLAAF). All nine people on board were killed in the crash.

As Vice Chairman, Lin Biao had been the official heir to Chairman Mao Zedong since 1966. From 1970, a rift developed between on one side Lin and his power base in the Army and Politburo, and on the other side, Mao, his allies Jiang Qing and Zhou Enlai, and their People's Liberation Army (PLA) factions. Issues included Lin's growing power in the PLA and his prominent role in Mao's cult of personality, which Mao had criticized as excessive. The crash was a key event at the midpoint of the ten-year Cultural Revolution, following which the Gang of Four gained prominence.

According to the Chinese government, Lin Biao was attempting to defect to the Soviet Union after a failed plot to assassinate Mao Zedong, but failed to sufficiently fuel the aircraft for the intended trip, resulting in a crash. Following Lin's death, there was skepticism in the West and the Soviet Union concerning the official explanation. Classified Soviet investigations in the immediate aftermath, including recovery of bodies, confirmed that Lin was among the dead, but that the aircraft had sufficient fuel to reach the USSR.

== Events ==
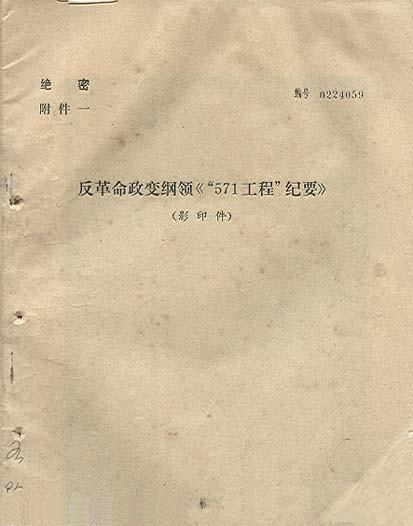
Project 571 Outline

=== Official Chinese narrative ===
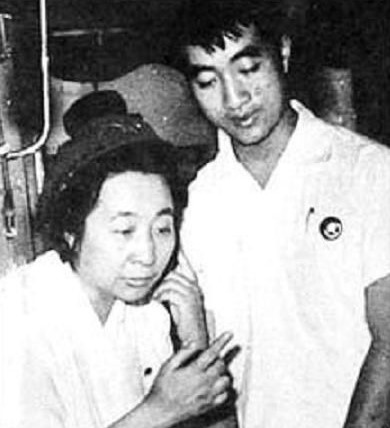
Lin Liguo with Ye Qun

According to the Chinese government, Lin Biao was made aware that Mao no longer trusted him after the 9th Central Committee, and he harbored a strong desire to seize supreme power. In February 1971 Lin and his wife, Ye Qun (who was then a Politburo member), began to plot Mao's assassination. In March 1971, Lin's son, Lin Liguo (who was a senior Air Force officer) held a secret meeting with his closest followers at an Air Force base in Shanghai. At this meeting, Lin Liguo and his subordinates supposedly drafted a plan to organize a coup, titled "Project 571". In Chinese, "5-7-1" (Chinese: 五七一; pinyin: wǔqīyī), is a homophone for "armed uprising" (Chinese: 武起义; pinyin: wǔqǐyì). Later that March, the group met again to formalize the structure of command following the proposed coup.

Mao was unaware of the coup plot, and, in August 1971, scheduled a conference for September to determine the political fate of Lin Biao. On 15 August, Mao left Beijing to discuss the issue with other senior political and military leaders in southern China. On 5 September, Lin received reports that Mao was preparing to purge him. On 8 September, Lin gave the order to his subordinates to proceed with the coup.

Lin's subordinates planned to assassinate Mao by sabotaging his train before he returned to Beijing, but Mao unexpectedly changed his route on 11 September and Mao safely returned to Beijing in the evening of 12 September. By failing to assassinate Mao, Lin's coup attempt failed.

Realizing that Mao was now fully aware of his abortive coup, Lin's party first considered fleeing south to their power base in Guangzhou, where they would establish an alternate "Party headquarters" and attack armed forces loyal to Mao. After hearing that Premier Zhou Enlai was investigating the incident, they abandoned this plan as impractical, and decided to flee to the Soviet Union instead. In the early morning of 13 September, Lin Biao, Ye Qun, Lin Liguo, and several personal aides attempted to flee to the Soviet Union and boarded a prearranged Trident 1E (registered as PLAAF 256), piloted by Pan Jingyin, the deputy commander of the PLAAF 34th division. The aircraft did not take aboard enough fuel before taking off, ran out of fuel, and crashed near Öndörkhaan in Mongolia on 13 September 1971. Everyone on board, eight men and one woman, was killed.

=== Pre-1994 international view of official Chinese explanation ===
The exact circumstances surrounding Lin's death remain unclear, due to a lack of surviving evidence. Many of the original government records relevant to Lin's death were secretly and intentionally destroyed, with the approval of the Politburo, during the brief period of Hua Guofeng's interregnum in the late 1970s. Among the records destroyed were telephone records, meeting minutes, personal notes, and desk diaries. The records, if they had survived, would have clarified the activities of Mao, Zhou Enlai, Jiang Qing, and Wang Dongxing relative to Lin, before and after Lin's death. Because of the destruction of government documentation related to Lin's death, the Chinese government has relied on alleged confessions of purged officials close to Lin to corroborate the official narrative, but non-Chinese scholars generally regard these confessions as unreliable.

Since 1971, scholars outside of China have been skeptical of the government's official explanation of the circumstances surrounding Lin's death. Skeptics assert the official narrative does not sufficiently explain why Lin, one of Mao's closest supporters and one of the most successful Communist generals, would suddenly attempt a poorly planned, abortive coup. The government narrative also does not sufficiently explain how and why Lin's aircraft crashed. Skeptics have claimed Lin's decision to flee to the Soviet Union was illogical, on the grounds the United States or Taiwan would have been safer destinations.

Western historians have contended that Lin did not have either the intention or the ability to usurp Mao's place within the government or the Party. One theory attempted to explain Lin's flight and death by observing that he opposed China's rapprochement with the United States, which Zhou Enlai was organizing with Mao's approval. Because the Chinese government never produced evidence to support their report that Lin was on board the aircraft, Western scholars originally doubted Lin had died in the crash. One book, published anonymously using a Chinese pseudonym in 1983, claimed Mao had actually had Lin and his wife killed in Beijing, and Lin Liguo had attempted to escape by air. Other scholars suggested Mao ordered the Chinese army to shoot down Lin's aircraft over Mongolia.

The Chinese government has no interest in re-evaluating its narrative on Lin Biao's death. When contacted in 1994 for its comment on fresh evidence that surfaced on the Lin Biao incident after the Cold War, the Chinese Foreign Ministry stated: "China already has a clear, authoritative conclusion about the Lin Biao incident. Other foreign reports of a conjectural nature are groundless." Non-Chinese scholars interpreted China's reluctance to consider contradictory evidence of its "official" history as the result of a desire to avoid exploring any issue that might lead to criticism of Mao Zedong or a re-evaluation of the Cultural Revolution in general, which might distract China from pursuing economic growth.

=== Subsequent scholarship and reliable eyewitness accounts ===
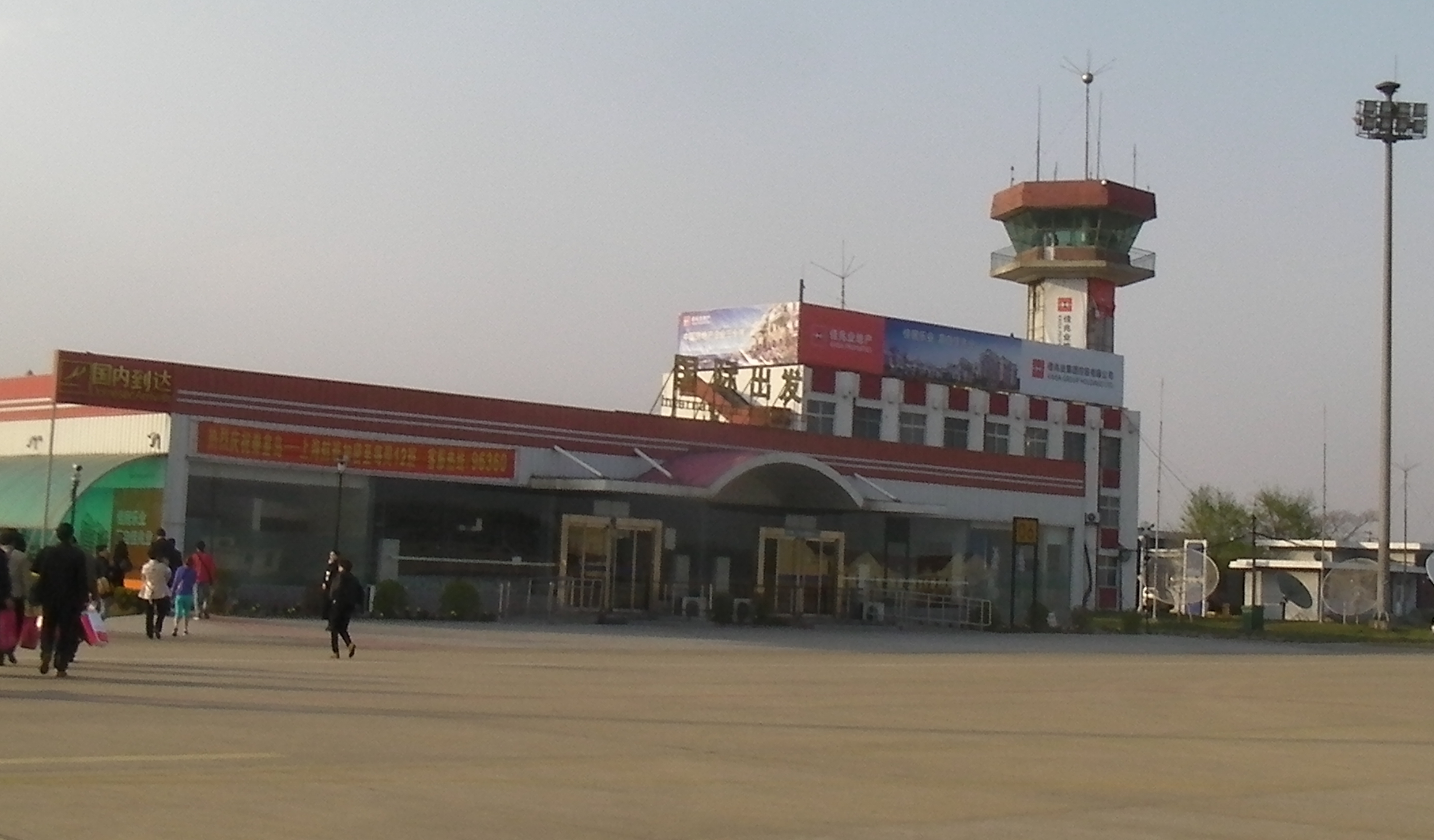
Qinhuangdao Shanhaiguan Airport, provenance of the aircraft

A six-month investigation by Western scholars in 1994 examined evidence in Russia, Mongolia, mainland China, the United States, and Taiwan, and came to a number of conclusions, some of which were contrary to the official Chinese version of events. The study confirmed Lin Biao, Ye Qun, and Lin Liguo were all killed in the crash. Lin's aircraft was travelling away from the Soviet Union at the time of its crash, making the exact sequence of events before Lin's death more confusing, and casting doubt on the possibility that Lin was attempting to seek asylum in the USSR. Lin's wife and son may have forced Lin to board the aircraft against his will. Several senior leaders within the Communist Party hierarchy knew Lin and his family would flee, but chose not to attempt to stop their flight. According to this study, Lin had attempted to contact the Kuomintang in Taiwan on two separate occasions shortly before his death. The findings of Lin's attempt to contact the Kuomintang supported earlier rumors from inside China that Lin was secretly negotiating with Chiang's government in order to restore the Kuomintang government in mainland China in return for a high position in the new government. The claims of Lin's contact with the Kuomintang have never been formally confirmed nor denied by either the governments in Beijing or Taipei.

According to numerous scholars who had studied archives and records over the subsequent years, including eyewitness accounts of others involved, indicated a sequence of events different from the official narrative. The whole series of events likely began on the night of 6 September 1971, when Lin Biao and his family first received word while in Beidaihe that Mao had made critical remarks of Lin during his trip in Southern China, and concluded that Mao was determined to purge them in the upcoming National Congress scheduled in October 1971.

On 7 September, Liguo confided in his sister Lin Liheng (known by the nickname "Doudou") that it is "better for us...to wage a struggle than wait for our doom." Liguo presented three possible courses of action: to assassinate Mao, to fly to Guangzhou where they could establish an alternate central committee in opposition to the central authorities in Beijing, or to flee to the Soviet Union. Liheng rejected all of her brother's proposals and suggested that their father resign from all of his positions to avoid trouble, to which Liguo retorted that their father would be detained regardless and would likely die in custody due to his waning health. After their conversation, Liheng immediately contacted the leaders of PLA Unit 8341 (Central Guard Unit), the unit responsible for her father's security, but was unsuccessful in convincing them that her brother and mother pressured her father into leaving Beidaihe for an unknown destination against his wishes. It was well-known among the security detail that the Lin family were dysfunctional.

On the night of 12 September, Lin Biao and Ye Qun were attending Liheng's engagement party in Beidaihe. Liguo, on hearing of Mao's early return to Beijing, immediately commandeered an Air Force Trident from Beijing to Beidaihe, where he arrived around 8 p.m., just as the Lin family was about to spend the evening watching films with the newly engaged couple and their friends. Lin Biao had retired to his room after taking sleeping pills when Liguo arrived at their residence. Liguo told Liheng that they had to leave for "Dalian or Guangzhou or Hong Kong: anywhere depending on the situation". Ye Qun was overheard trying to convince Lin Biao to head to Guangzhou, but Lin had "remained silent" and later went to bed. Convinced that Ye Qun and Liguo were manipulating her father, she slipped away to warn the head of security to report to Beijing on the situation unfolding in Beidaihe, to which the head of security agreed.

Premier Zhou Enlai was attending a meeting at the Great Hall of the People when an urgent telephone call came in informing Zhou that an Air Force jet was at Beidaihe without authorization and conveying Liheng's message that Lin Biao was about to be taken to an unknown destination, possibly against his will. Zhou immediately called Wu Faxian, the head of the Air Force, and issued orders to ground the aircraft. When the news reached Beidaihe, it is likely that Ye Qun and Lin Liguo made the impromptu decision to escape.

In an attempt to dispel suspicion, at around 11:30 p.m., Ye Qun called the Premier and informed him that Lin Biao was planning to fly to Dalian the next morning, and denied they had prepared an aircraft at Shanhaiguan. Zhou then told Ye to wait for him to travel to see Lin before they left Beidaihe (where they were staying), issued orders to neutralize potentially disruptive officers close to Lin (Wu Faxian and Huang Yongsheng), and ordered that two aircraft be readied in Beijing so he could fly to Lin's residence to personally deal with the matter.

Ye then made an announcement that they were to pack quickly and head to the airport immediately. Ye Qun and Liguo packed the semi-conscious Lin into an armored limousine. At around midnight on 13 September, they pulled away from their residence, sped past a cordon of guards and headed straight for Shanhaiguan airport, 40 kilometres (25 mi) away, where their aircraft was waiting. Along the way, Lin's chief bodyguard leapt from the vehicle and was shot and wounded. The chief bodyguard later claimed that Lin had asked along the way to the airport how long it would take to reach Irkutsk. There were unresolved questions surrounding the events at the residence, such as the actions of Unit 8341, who had already been notified of the situation by Liheng and were likely under the instructions of Beijing the entire time, yet made no attempt to stop Lin and his family for the next few hours. At one point, the head of Unit 8341 even mysteriously told Liheng to accompany Lin and his entourage to the airport, stating that the "Party Centre" had ordered her to do so, which she and her fiancee refused to heed.

According to eyewitnesses, Lin Biao, Ye Qun, and Lin Liguo, along with some of their aides, had clambered aboard, and the Trident aircraft had apparently been ordered to take off despite Zhou's orders. Accounts differed on whether the plane was refueled prior to takeoff. There was no co-pilot, navigator, or radio operator on board. At around 12:30 a.m., with the navigation lights turned off and the airport in total darkness, the Trident aircraft took off. On takeoff, their plane grazed a fuel tanker, resulting in the undercarriage being torn away.

Lin's aircraft initially traveled southeast in the direction of Guangzhou, then returned twenty minutes later and circled the airport several times as if it were trying to land, but the runway lights had been turned off. It then flew west before turning north towards the border. It is likely that the pilot, Pan Jingyin, was told to head for Mongolia only after the group learned that Zhou had ordered Chinese airspace to be closed to air traffic. The aircraft was flying at an altitude of 300 meters to avoid radar detection. At 1:50 a.m., the aircraft left Chinese airspace.

Soviet officials and Mongolian witnesses reported that the aircraft then flew north, over Mongolia and almost to the Soviet border, but then turned around and began flying south back towards China before it crashed. A Mongolian who witnessed the crash reported that the aircraft's tail was on fire when it crashed. The crash occurred at around 2:30 a.m..

Meanwhile, none of Zhou's instructions prevented Lin's flight, and he learned Lin's aircraft had taken off before he could fly to see Lin. Zhou had ordered all aircraft nationwide to be grounded without the written permission of Mao and senior military leaders. Wu Faxian even telephoned the control tower at Shanhaiguan airport to give a direct order to Pan not to fly under any circumstances, which Pan assured him he would not. Zhou rushed to Zhongnanhai to brief Mao of Lin's flight probably sometime after 11 p.m., and asked Mao if he wanted to order Lin's aircraft to be shot down, but Mao replied that they should "let him go" and "don't shoot".

Mao was then evacuated to the Great Hall of the People where, at around 3 a.m. on 13 September, the Politburo was convened to be informed of Mao's return to Beijing and Lin's apparent flight from Beidaihe. At 8:30 p.m., 13 September, the Mongolian Foreign Ministry summoned the Chinese ambassador to Mongolia, Xu Wenyi, to make a formal complaint about an unauthorized entrance of a Chinese aircraft into Mongolian airspace, and reported to the ambassador that the aircraft had crashed, killing all on board. The Chinese ambassador then phoned Zhou Enlai, who then instructed the ambassador to inform the Mongolians that the aircraft had entered Mongolian airspace because it had gone off course. Mao's reaction to the crash in Mongolia was unsympathetic, stating only "That's what you get for running away."

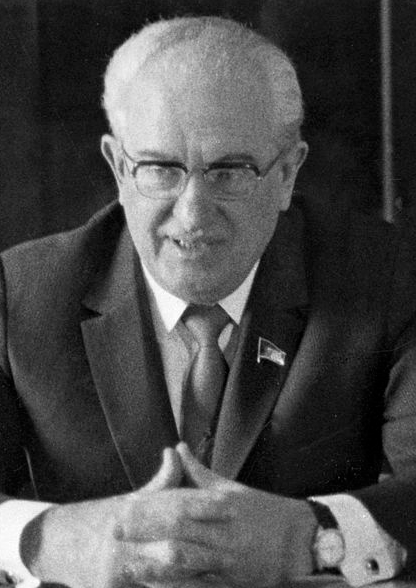
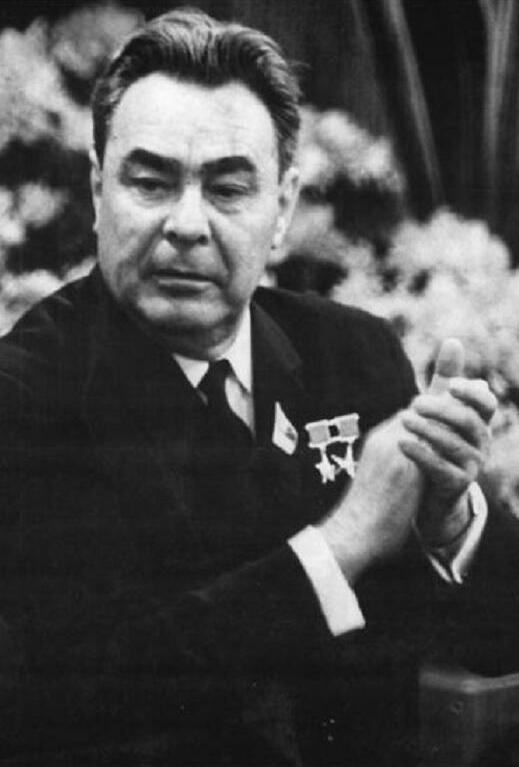
Only members of the investigative team itself, KGB chairman Yuri Andropov, and Soviet Leader Leonid Brezhnev were informed of the results of the forensic examination.

Mongolian investigators were the first on site to inspect the wreckage, arriving later the same day. They found an identity card belonging to Lin Liguo, confirming Lin Liguo's presence on the flight. Markings on the aircraft and surviving miscellaneous personal items confirmed the aircraft and passengers had originated from China, but the Mongolians were uncertain that any of the dead were either Lin Biao or Ye Qun. Only after inspecting the crash with the Chinese investigators did the Mongolians bury the dead on-site.

Through the Chinese ambassador, Zhou requested and received permission for Chinese embassy staff to inspect the wreckage of Lin's aircraft and the bodies, which they did on 15–16 September. The staff reported to Zhou that the aircraft had caught fire while attempting to land, and then exploded. The bodies were burnt beyond recognition. Zhou then sent additional staff to interview Mongolian witnesses of the crash, and to perform a detailed technical assessment of the crash. The report concluded the aircraft had approximately 30 minutes of fuel when it crashed, and that it attempted to land with its landing gear and flaps retracted. The aircraft had overturned and caught fire while trying to make an emergency landing in the steppe. Its right wing had dragged along the ground and caught fire while aircraft remains were scattered across an area of four square miles.

In late 1971, a Soviet medical team secretly traveled to the crash site and exhumed the bodies, which were by then modestly decomposed. The team removed the skulls of two of the corpses suspected to be Lin Biao and Ye Qun and took them back to the Soviet Union for forensic examination. In 1972, the team concluded the skulls belonged to Lin Biao and Ye Qun (the skulls are still stored in Russian archives). In order to corroborate their findings the team returned to Mongolia a second time to inspect the body believed to be Lin Biao's. After exhuming the body a second time the team found evidence of tuberculosis — from which Lin had suffered — in the corpse's right lung, confirming the Soviet identification. The Soviet team was not able to determine the cause of the crash, but hypothesized that the pilot misjudged his altitude while intentionally flying low to evade radar. Judging from the fires that burned after the crash, the Soviets estimated that the aircraft had enough fuel to fly to the Soviet cities of Irkutsk or Chita. All of the work and its results were kept secret from the public: outside of the investigative team, only KGB chairman Yuri Andropov and Soviet leader Leonid Brezhnev were informed. The report remained classified until the early 1990s, after the end of the Cold War.

== Aftermath ==
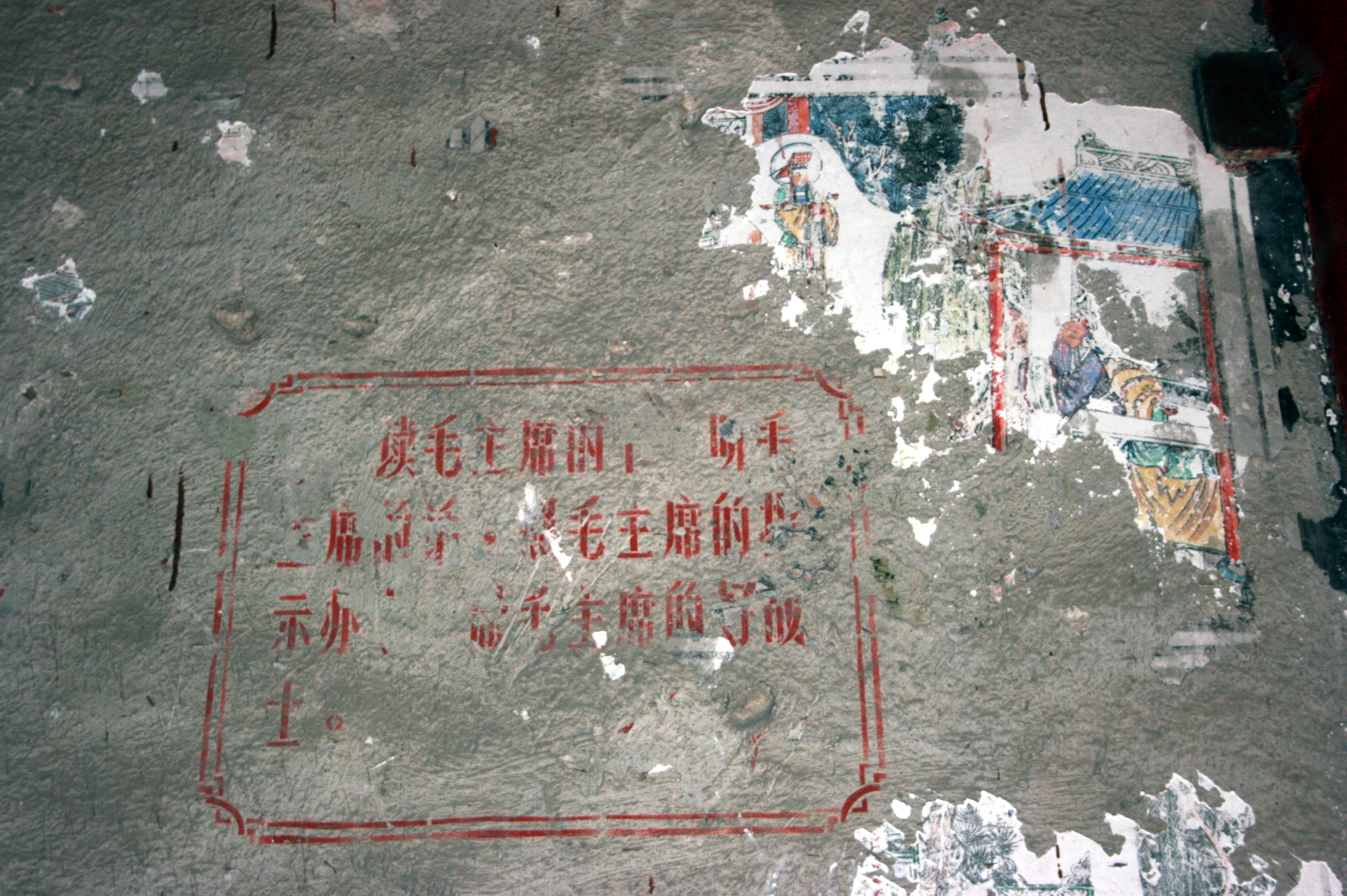
Graffiti with Lin Biao's foreword to Mao's Little Red Book. Lin's name (lower right) was later scratched out, presumably after his death.

Lin Biao was survived by Doudou. All military officials identified as being close to Lin or his family (most of China's high military command) were purged within weeks of Lin's disappearance. On 14 September, Zhou announced to the Politburo that four of the highest-ranking military officials in China were immediately suspended from duty and ordered to submit self-criticisms admitting their associations with Lin. This announcement was quickly followed by the arrest of ninety-three people suspected of being close to Lin, and within a month of Lin's disappearance over 1,000 senior Chinese military officials were purged. The official purge of Lin's supporters continued until it was closed by the 10th Central Committee in August 1973. The incident marked the end of the myth within the Party that Mao had always been absolutely correct.

The National Day celebrations on 1 October 1971, were cancelled, which sparked unfounded speculation in the West that Mao had died. Meetings with foreign dignitaries by Zhou were also abruptly cancelled and Chinese airspace remained closed for days in mid-September 1971. There were no references to Lin in party newspapers and radio broadcasts after 15 September 1971.

On 30 September 1971, the Mongolian press agency through the Soviet TASS news agency published the news that a Chinese Air Force plane had crashed in Mongolia two weeks prior, though the identities of the passengers were not revealed. In the West, there were speculations surrounding Lin Biao after observers noticed Chinese media denouncement of Lin began appearing in late 1971 along with the unusual events in October 1971. It was only in July 1972 that the Chinese government confirmed the news to the world shortly after Mao first revealed Lin's actions during his meetings with Sri Lankan Prime Minister Sirimavo Bandaranaike and French Foreign Minister Maurice Schumann.

The news of Lin's death was announced to all Communist Party officials in mid-October 1971, and to the Chinese public in June 1972. The news was publicly received with shock and confusion. Mao Zedong was especially disturbed by the incident: his health deteriorated, and he became depressed. At the end of 1971, he became seriously ill; he suffered a stroke in January 1972, received emergency medical treatment, and his health remained unstable. Mao became nostalgic about some of his revolutionary comrades whose purging Lin had supported, and backed Zhou Enlai's efforts to conduct a widespread rehabilitation of veteran revolutionaries, and to correct some of the excesses of the Cultural Revolution (which he blamed on Lin Biao). He also called on Zhou to seek a rapprochement with the United States, which prompted the visit by Richard Nixon to China in February 1972.

In the aftermath of the purge of Lin's supporters, Zhou Enlai replaced Lin as the second most powerful man in China, and Jiang Qing and her followers were never able to displace him. Without the support of Lin, Jiang was unable to prevent Zhou's efforts to improve China's relationship with the United States, or to rehabilitate cadres who had been purged during the Cultural Revolution. The clause in the Party constitution indicating that Lin was Mao's successor was not officially amended until the 10th Central Committee in August 1973. Despite being approved by the CCP Central Committee, the 1970 Draft Constitution of China was not adopted and instead confiscated and destroyed following the incident because it included Lin Biao's name.

The position of the Chinese government on Lin and the circumstances of his death changed several times over the decade following 1971. For over a year, the Party first attempted to cover up the details of Lin's death. The government then began to issue partial details of the event, followed by an anti-Lin Biao propaganda campaign. After Mao's death, in 1976, the government confirmed its official condemnation of Lin and generally ceased any dialogue concerning Lin's place in history. Throughout the 1970s, high-ranking leaders of the Chinese Communist Party, including Hua Guofeng, spread the story to foreign delegates that Lin had conspired with the KGB to assassinate Mao.

In 1973, Jiang Qing, Mao's fourth wife and a former political ally of Lin's, started the Criticize Lin, Criticize Confucius campaign, aimed at using Lin's scarred image to attack Zhou Enlai. Much of this propaganda campaign involved the creative falsification of history, including (false) details about how Lin had opposed Mao's leadership and tactics throughout his career. Lin's name became involved in Jiang's propaganda campaign after flashcards, made by Ye Qun to record Lin's thoughts, were discovered in Lin's residence following his death. Some of these flashcards recorded opinions critical of Mao. According to Lin's writings, Mao "will fabricate 'your' opinion first, then he will change 'your' opinion – which is not actually yours, but his fabrication. I should be careful of this standard trick." Another critical comment of Lin's states that Mao "worships himself and has a blind faith in himself. He worships himself to such an extent that all accomplishments are attributed to him, but all mistakes are made by others". Lin's private criticisms of Mao were directly contradictory of the public image cultivated by Lin, who publicly stated following the Great Leap Forward that all mistakes of the past were the result of deviating from Mao's instructions.

Like many major proponents of the Cultural Revolution, Lin's image was manipulated after Mao's death in 1976, and many negative aspects of the Cultural Revolution were blamed on Lin. After October 1976, those in power also blamed Mao's supporters, the so-called Gang of Four. In 1980, the Chinese government held a series of "special trials" to identify those most responsible for the Cultural Revolution. In 1981, the government released their verdict: that Lin Biao must be held, along with Jiang Qing, as one of the two major "counter-revolutionary cliques" responsible for the excesses of the late 1960s. According to the official Party verdict, Lin and Jiang were singled out for blame because they led intra-Party cliques which took advantage of Mao's "mistakes" to advance their own political goals, engaging in "criminal activity" for their own self-benefit. Among the "crimes" he was charged with was the ouster of China's head of state, President Liu Shaoqi. Lin was found to be primarily responsible for using "false evidence" to orchestrate a "political frame-up" of Liu. Lin has been officially remembered as one of the greatest villains of modern China since then. Lin was never politically rehabilitated, so the charges against him continue to stand.

For several decades, Lin's name and image were censored within China, but in recent years a balanced image of Lin has reappeared in popular culture: surviving aides and family members have published memoirs about their experience with Lin; scholars have explored most surviving evidence relevant to his life and death, and have gained exposure within the official Chinese media; movies set before 1949 have made reference to Lin; and Lin's name has re-appeared in Chinese history textbooks, recognizing his contributions to the victory of the Red Army. Within modern China, Lin is regarded as one of the Red Army's best military strategists. In 2007, a big portrait of Lin was added to the Chinese Military Museum in Beijing, included in a display of the "Ten Marshals", a group considered to be the founders of China's armed forces.

== See also ==
- 2023 Wagner Group plane crash – 2023 airliner crash in Russia
- Assassination of Juvénal Habyarimana and Cyprien Ntaryamira
- Smolensk air disaster

== Sources ==
- Barnouin, Barbara and Yu Changgen. Zhou Enlai: A Political Life. Hong Kong: Chinese University of Hong Kong, 2006. ISBN 962-996-280-2. Retrieved on 12 March 2011.
- Hannam, Peter, and Lawrence, Susan V. "Solving a Chinese Puzzle: Lin Biao's Final Days and Death, After Two Decades of Intrigue". U.S. News & World Report. 23 January 1994. Retrieved 21 November 2011.
- He, Henry Yuhuai. Dictionary of the Political Thought of the People's Republic of China. United States: East Gate. 2001. ISBN 0-7656-0569-4.
- Hu Chi-hsi. "Mao, Lin Biao, and the Fifth Encirclement Campaign". The China Quarterly. No. 82. June 1980.
- Mackerras, Colin, Donald Hugh McMillen, and Donal Andrew Watson. Dictionary of the Politics of the People's Republic of China. Great Britain: Routelage. 1998. ISBN 0-415-15450-2. Retrieved 9 November 2011.
- North, Robert C., ed. "Liu Shaoqi". Encyclopædia Britannica. 16 August 2013. Retrieved 28 June 2014.
- Pacepa, Ion Mihai. "The Kremlin's Killing Ways" National Review Online. 28 November 2006. Retrieved 21 January 2012.
- Qiu Jin. The Culture of Power: The Lin Biao Incident in the Cultural Revolution. Stanford, California: Stanford University Press. 1999. Retrieved 12 November 2011.
- Qiu Jin. "Distorting History: Lessons From The Lin Biao Incident". Quest. Vol. 3, Issue 2, June 2002. Retrieved 18 November 2011.
- Ross, Robert S. "From Lin Biao to Deng Xiaoping: Elite Instability and China's U. S. Policy". The China Quarterly. No.118. June 1989. pp. 265–299.
