= Qinhuangdao Beidaihe Airport =

Civilian airport in Hebei, north China

Qinhuangdao Beidaihe Airport 秦皇岛北戴河机场
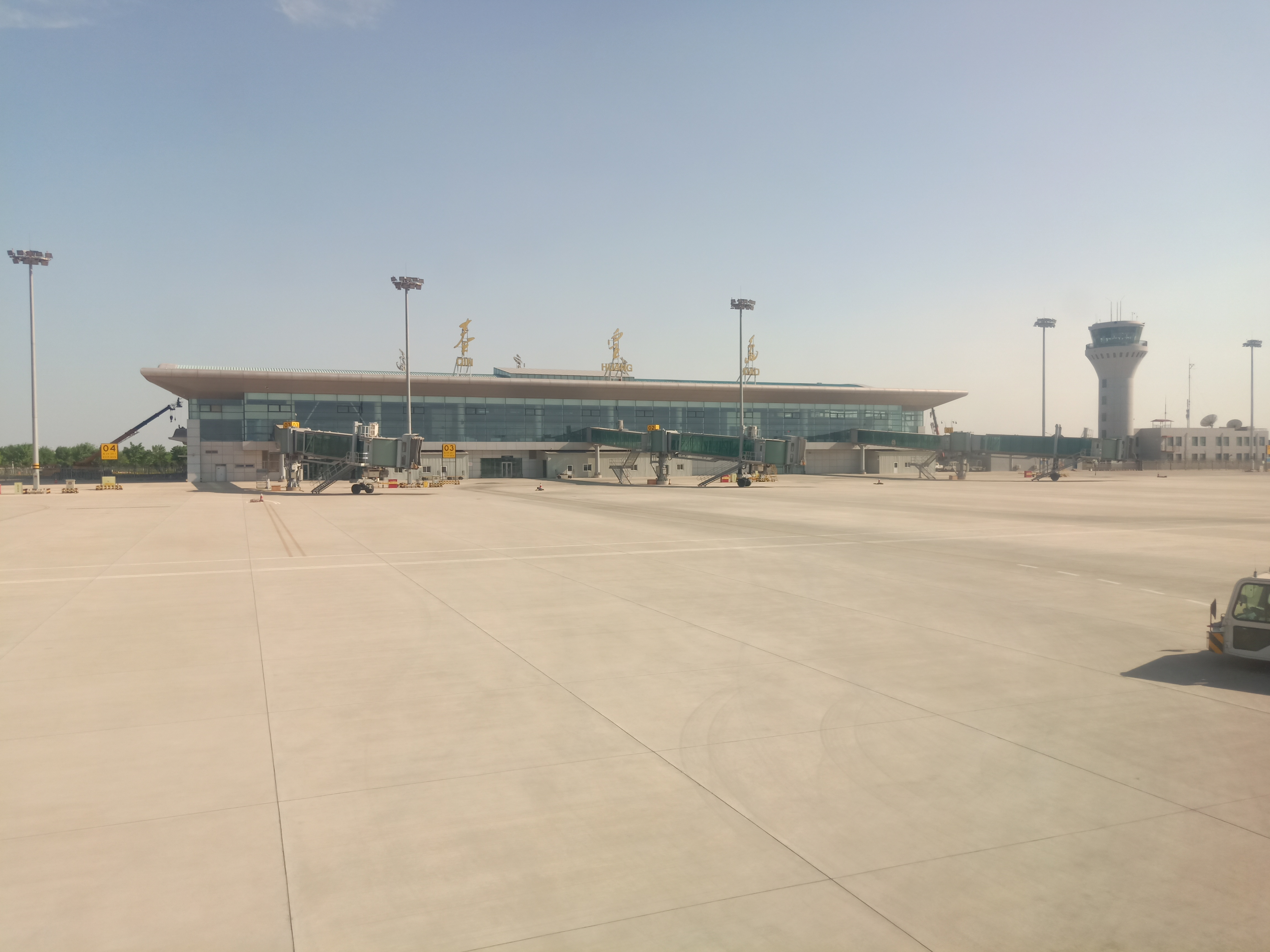
- IATA: BPE; ICAO: ZBDH

Summary
- Airport type: Public
- Serves: Qinhuangdao, Hebei
- Location: Longjiadian Town, Changli, Hebei, China
- Opened: 31 March 2016; 10 years ago
- Elevation AMSL: 15.8 m (52 ft)
- Coordinates: 39°39′59″N 119°3′32″E

Map
- Location of airport in Hebei

Runways
| Direction | Length | | Surface |
| Direction | m | ft | Surface |
|---|---|---|---|
| 08/26 | 2,600 | 8,530 | Concrete |

Statistics (2025)
- Passengers: 292,657
- Aircraft movements: 11,365
- Cargo (metric tons): 239.8

Qinhuangdao Beidaihe Airport
- Simplified Chinese: 秦皇岛北戴河机场
- Traditional Chinese: 秦皇島北戴河機場
Transcriptions
Standard Mandarin
- Hanyu Pinyin: Qínhuángdǎo Běidàihé Jīchǎng

Qinhuangdao Beidaihe Airport (IATA: BPE, ICAO: ZBDH) is an airport serving the city of Qinhuangdao, Hebei province, north China. It is located in Longjiadian Town, Changli County, 47 kilometres (29 mi) from the city center and 34 kilometres (21 mi) from Beidaihe.

== History ==
The history of Qinhuangdao Beidaihe Airport can be traced back to the era of Qinhuangdao Shanhaiguan Airport. Qinhuangdao Shanhaiguan Airport was built in 1952 and served as a military airport until 1984.

On September 13, 1971, Marshal Lin Biao, Vice Premier and Minister of National Defense of China, attempted to escape China from Shanhaiguan Airport in his Hawker Siddeley Trident. The plane subsequently crashed in Mongolia, killing all nine people on board, including Lin Biao, his wife Ye Qun, and their son Lin Liguo.

After the reform and opening up, the airport began to be developed for civil aviation transportation, and the opening ceremony was held in 1985, officially establishing the Qinhuangdao Shanhaiguan Airport. However, the airport only handled fewer than 2,000 passengers that year. Less than a year after its opening, due to limited service conditions and insufficient passenger and cargo capacity, the terminal closed in March 1986. On July 1, 1987, after small-scale renovation and upgrading, Qinhuangdao Shanhaiguan Airport resumed civil aviation operations.

In September 1992, due to the limited capacity of the airport's runways and taxiways, which could not meet the needs of passenger and cargo transportation, the Qinhuangdao Government and the Naval Air Force invested a total of 35 million to renovate and expand the airport. After the expansion, the airport has reached the 4C level standard of international civil aviation and can meet the needs of B737, MD82 and other aircraft types.

In 2006, Shanhaiguan Airport became one of the five major takeoff and landing airports for the 2008 Beijing Olympics. In order to meet the needs of the Olympic Games, Qinhuangdao Shanhaiguan Airport undergone important renovation projects.

In July 2004, a plan to build a new Qinhuangdao Beidaihe Airport was proposed and approved by the State Council in July 2009.

The airport started construction in May 2012. It is about 20 kilometers away from Beidaihe New District. The runway is 2,600 meters long and 60 meters wide (including shoulders). It is a dedicated airport for civil aviation transportation.

The airport was opened on 31 March 2016, replacing the old Shanhaiguan Airport, which was shared with the military, as Qinhuangdao's main airport. Shanhaiguan Airport reverted to sole military use.

== Facilities ==
The airport occupies an area of 2,195 mu. It has a runway that is 2,600 meters long and 60 meters wide, and a 10,592-square-metre (114,010 sq ft) terminal building. It is designed to handle 500,000 passengers and 1,200 tons of cargo annually.

== Airlines and destinations ==
| Airlines | Destinations |
|---|---|
| Chengdu Airlines | Chengdu–Tianfu, Shijiazhuang |
| China Express Airlines | Baotou, Shijiazhuang, Xi'an |
| Shanghai Airlines | Shanghai–Pudong |
| Yakutia Airlines | Seasonal charter: Blagoveshchensk, Khabarovsk, Vladivostok |

== See also ==
- List of airports in China
- List of the busiest airports in China
