= Ye Qun =

Wife of Chinese marshal Lin Biao (1920–1971)

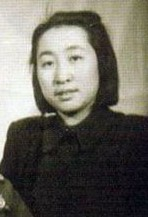

Personal details
- Born: 2 December 1917 Minhou County, Fujian, Republic of China
- Died: 13 September 1971 (aged 53) Öndörkhaan, Mongolia
- Party: Chinese Communist Party
- Spouse: Lin Biao
- Children: Lin Liheng, Lin Liguo

Military service
- Allegiance: People's Republic of China
- Branch/service: People's Liberation Army Ground Force
- Years of service: 19??–1971
- Rank: Colonel
- Battles/wars: Chinese Civil War

Ye Qun (simplified Chinese: 叶群; traditional Chinese: 葉群; pinyin: Yè Qún; 2 December 1917 – 13 September 1971) was a Chinese military officer and politician, and the wife of Lin Biao, the Vice Chairman of the Chinese Communist Party. She acted for her husband in the purge of Luo Ruiqing in 1965, sat on the Administrative Group of the Central Military Commission from 1967, and was a member of the 9th Politburo of the Chinese Communist Party from 1969. She died with Lin Biao and their son Lin Liguo in a plane crash over Mongolia on 13 September 1971.

== Early life ==
Ye Qun was born in Minhou County, Fujian Province, and was a native of the Fuzhou area. Her original name was Ye Jingyi, which she later changed to Ye Jin, and she took the name Ye Qun after arriving in Yan'an. Her year of birth is usually given as 1917, but the Sydney Morning Herald described her as 50 at the time of her death.

According to the writer Gu Yongzhong, she took part in a speech contest of the Kuomintang's Three Principles of the People Youth League, worked as an announcer at the Central Broadcasting Station in Nanjing and attended a training class of the Youth War Service Corps. In 1938, she travelled from Nanchang to Yan'an with her friend Xue Ming, with an introduction from the New Fourth Army's office in Jiangxi, and studied at the Yan'an Women's University. During the Yan'an Rectification Movement of 1943, her past ties to the Kuomintang were raised as a concern, and Xue Ming asked her to clarify whether she had completed the formalities of joining the Chinese Communist Party.

Ye Qun married Lin Biao in Yan'an on 1 July 1942. It was Lin's third marriage. The couple had two children: a daughter, Lin Liheng, and a son, Lin Liguo.

== Political career ==
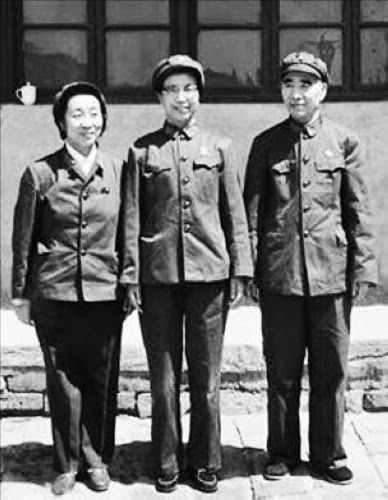
From left: Ye Qun with Jiang Qing and Lin Biao

In late 1965, she assisted Lin Biao in bringing down his adversary, Luo Ruiqing, the Chief of the General Staff of the People's Liberation Army. In a letter to Mao, Lin wrote that he was sending Ye Qun to deliver materials and give Mao a preliminary oral report, and the party's official account later held that her false accusations persuaded Mao to act against Luo.

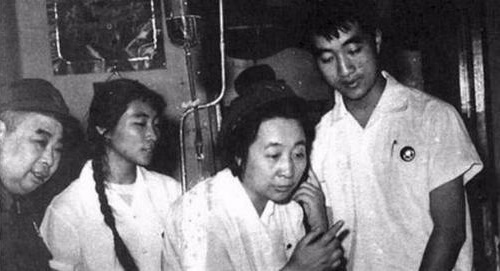
Ye Qun (second from right) with her son Lin Liguo (far right)

On 17 August 1967, she was one of four people, under the air force commander Wu Faxian, whom Zhou Enlai and the Central Cultural Revolution Group directed to form a small group to handle the Cultural Revolution in the military units and organs based in Beijing. The group became the Administrative Group of the Central Military Commission, and when it was reorganised on 30 March 1968 under Huang Yongsheng, she remained one of its five members. In early October 1969, she asked Wu Faxian to find a post for her son, and Lin Liguo was appointed deputy director of the Air Force Headquarters Office later that month.

At the first plenary session of the 9th Central Committee on 28 April 1969, Ye Qun was elected to the Politburo, as was Jiang Qing.

At the second plenary session of the 9th Central Committee at Lushan in August 1970, Ye Qun played a leading part in the campaign by Lin Biao's supporters to retain the post of State Chairman. According to the official account, she told Wu Faxian on 11 August that Lin Biao still favoured keeping the post, and on the evening of 23 August she instructed the generals to stop raising the issue directly and instead to stress Mao's "genius" and to attack Zhang Chunqiao without naming him. On 25 August, she, Wu Faxian, Li Zuopeng and Qiu Huizuo spoke at the meetings of several regional groups, which according to the Beijing party leader Wu De made the atmosphere very tense. During his tour of southern China in 1971, Mao blamed Ye Qun for mobilising people at the plenum. The historian Sun Wanguo argues that Ye Qun, whose rivalry with the group around Jiang Qing was central to the dispute, may have been the real driving force at Lushan, while Lin Biao himself was only peripherally involved.

== Project 571 and death ==
During the Cultural Revolution, tensions between Jiang Qing and Lin Biao's faction escalated. The party later accused Lin Liguo of conspiring with his parents to kill Mao during Mao's tour of southern China in August and September 1971, as part of the plan known as Project 571. Mao changed his travel plans on 10 September, and returned to Beijing on 12 September, arriving at Fengtai East station at about 3 pm. That night, their daughter Lin Liheng reported her family's plans to Premier Zhou Enlai a few hours before the flight.

At 11:30 pm on 12 September, Ye Qun telephoned Zhou Enlai to ask about the aircraft that had been sent to Beidaihe, and Zhou's evasive answer increased the family's alarm. According to the official account, Lin Biao and Ye Qun had first planned to fly south to Guangzhou, but they then decided to flee north. Lin Liguo's former fiancée, Zhang Ning, said that Lin Liguo and his mother feared an imminent purge by Mao, and that they took Lin Biao, who was drowsy from medication, to the waiting plane. Lin Liheng has claimed that her father was drugged with sleeping pills and taken aboard by her mother and brother, but the researcher Yu Ruxin argues that Lin Biao prepared the defection with his family.

The Lin family, including Lin Biao, Ye Qun, and Lin Liguo, fled in a PLAAF Hawker Siddeley Trident, from Qinhuangdao Shanhaiguan Airport on 13 September 1971. The aircraft took off at about 0:32 am, without waiting for the co-pilot, navigator or attendants. It crashed in eastern Mongolia at about 2:25 am, killing all nine people on board.

Further information from the Party documents later released state:

"the plane was making for the Soviet Union but was inadequately fueled for such a trip; it also had on board neither navigator nor radio operator. It crashed in Mongolia on September 13, 1971, burning to death all on board."

However, according to the historian J. D. Spence, "this story is essentially beyond verification, since the photographs later released by the Chinese authorities are of dubious authenticity and details on Lin Biao’s exact plans and on the other plotters are blurred". The government narrative also does not sufficiently explain how and why Lin Biao's plane crashed. It is also still unclear whether Lin Biao himself planned a coup, or whether his wife Ye Qun and his son Lin Liguo had such plans and did not inform Lin Biao about it. Skeptics have claimed that Lin's decision to flee to the Soviet Union was illogical, on the grounds that the United States or Taiwan would have been safer destinations.

Mongolians who saw the crash site soon afterwards described the dead woman as much younger than Ye Qun, which led to doubts about whether she and Lin Biao had been on board. A KGB team exhumed the bodies twice, and removed the heads of the oldest-looking man and of the woman for examination. Zhang Ning said that Lin Liguo had given his mother contraceptives made in Hong Kong, and a packet of them was later found among the woman's possessions. The KGB investigators concluded that Lin Biao and Ye Qun had died in the crash.

== See also ==
- Project 571
- Jiang Qing
