= Anshan, Hebei =

Anshan 安山镇
- Town
- Location in Hebei
- Coordinates: 39°42′52″N 118°59′47″E
- Country: People's Republic of China
- Province: Hebei
- Prefecture-level city: Qinhuangdao
- County: Changli County
- Village-level divisions: 39 villages

Area
  - Total: 81 km^{2} (31 sq mi)
- Elevation: 23 m (75 ft)

Population
  - Total: 48,000
  - Density: 590/km^{2} (1,500/sq mi)
- Time zone: UTC+8 (China Standard)
- Area code: 0335

Anshan (Chinese: 安山; pinyin: Ānshān) is a town in Changli County, in the northeast of Hebei province, China, located 14 kilometres (8.7 mi) west of the county seat. It has an area of 81 km^{2} (31 sq mi) and a population of 48,000. As of 2011, the town has 39 villages under its administration.

== See also ==
- List of township-level divisions of Hebei
