= Dapuhe =

Dapuhe 大蒲河镇
- Town
- Dàpúhé Zhèn
- Location in Hebei Location in China
- Coordinates: 39°41′56″N 119°17′34″E
- Country: People's Republic of China
- Province: Hebei
- Prefecture-level city: Qinhuangdao
- County: Changli

Area
  - Total: 79.63 km^{2} (30.75 sq mi)

Population (2010)
  - Total: 29,919
  - Density: 375.7/km^{2} (973/sq mi)
- Time zone: UTC+8 (China Standard)

Dapuhe (Chinese: 大蒲河镇; pinyin: Dàpúhé Zhèn) is a town located in Changli County, Qinhuangdao, Hebei, China. According to the 2010 census, Dapuhe had a population of 29,919, including 15,020 males and 14,899 females. The population was distributed as follows: 4,676 people aged under 14, 22,396 people aged between 15 and 64, and 2,847 people aged over 65.

== See also ==
- List of township-level divisions of Hebei
