= Project 571 =

Alleged plot to overthrow Mao Zedong

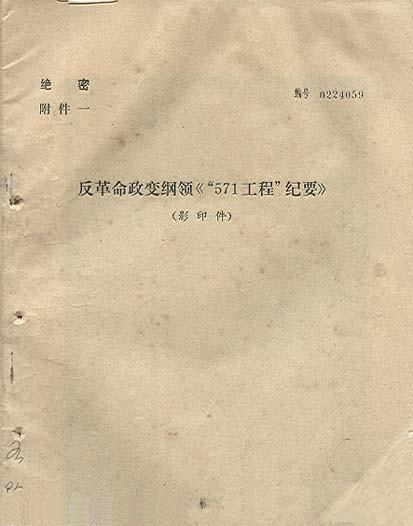
A copy of the Draft of Project 571

Project 571 (Chinese: 五七一工程; pinyin: Wǔqīyī gōngchéng) was the code name given to an alleged plot to execute a coup d'état against Chairman Mao Zedong in 1971 by the supporters of Lin Biao, then Vice Chairman of the Chinese Communist Party. In Chinese, the numbers "5-7-1" (五七一; wǔqīyī) sound very similar to the term 'armed uprising' (武起义; wǔqǐyì).

The Chinese Communist Party initially claimed that Lin Biao himself had devised Project 571, but evidence inside and outside of China has made it more likely that Lin's son, Lin Liguo, a high-ranking officer in the People's Liberation Army Air Force, instead developed the plot. Any plots that may have been planned or attempted by Lin Biao or his family ultimately failed. Lin's family attempted to flee China for the Soviet Union, but died when their plane crashed in Mongolia on September 13, 1971. A draft copy of the Project 571 outline was discovered following Lin's death, and was publicly circulated by the Chinese government as a means of explaining the event.

== Details of the plot ==
Now he (Mao) has abused the trust and status given to him by the Chinese people, and has gone to the opposite direction historically.
In fact, he has become the contemporary Qin Shi Huang. In order to be responsible to the Chinese people and Chinese history, our waiting and patience have limits!
He was not a genuine Marxist-Leninist, but the greatest feudal tyrant in Chinese history who practiced the principles of Confucianism under the guise of Marxism-Leninism and the laws of Qin Shi Huang.

现在他滥用中国人民给其信任和地位，历史地走向反面。
实际上他已成了当代的秦始皇，为了向中国人民负责，向中国历史负责，我们的等待和忍耐是有限度的！
他不是一个真正的马列主义者，而是一个行孔孟之道借马列主义之皮、执秦始皇之法的中国历史上最大的封建暴君。

— Lin Liguo, Project 571

The outline was not written in the form of a practicable military plan, but more as a political declaration. Of the nine sections of the outline, only two deal directly with military strategy; the remaining sections either criticize the policies of the Cultural Revolution or attack the personality of Chinese leader Mao Zedong. Because the writers of the outline apparently lacked both the military knowledge and the ability to mobilize large groups of forces, Western scholars generally reject the possibility that Lin Biao could have personally planned Project 571.

Of the sections which deal with military strategy, the outline's authors mention the support of a number of disparate forces, none of which were overwhelmingly powerful. The plotters believed they were supported by the equivalent of approximately six to eight Air Force divisions: the Fourth and Fifth Air Force Corps; the Ninth, Eighteenth, and Thirty-Fourth Air Force Divisions; the Thirty-Fourth Tank Regiment; and (perhaps unusually) the Bureau of Civilian Aviation. The authors also noted that they expected the support of an "auxiliary force" composed of the Twentieth and Thirty-Eighth Armies (Lin's own elite units) and several provinces, which were only vaguely mentioned. The power of this combination of forces was not great, compared to the rest of the People's Liberation Army, and the authors of the Outline noted that "at present the preparation of our strength is still not adequate".

The military plans contained in the outline were below the standards that could have been expected from Lin, one of modern China's most successful generals. Because he was a master of maneuvering ground forces, it is unusual that he would have relied almost exclusively on the Air Force, even though his own elite forces were readily available to him. In the Chinese Civil War, Lin had become a master of delaying decisive confrontations until he knew that the chances of victory had become overwhelming, and scholars note that it would have been out of character for Lin to have staked his political career on such a poorly planned military coup, whose chances of success were slim. There is no direct evidence that suggests that either Lin or his generals were involved in the coup plot. Many scholars believe that his son, Lin Liguo, a high-ranking officer in the People's Liberation Air Force, was instead the author. Within China, the theory that Lin Liguo drafted the outline for Project 571 was corroborated by the testimony of Lin's generals in the special trials of the "Lin Biao and Jiang Qing Counter-Revolutionary Cliques", which were held in 1980.

== History of the plot ==
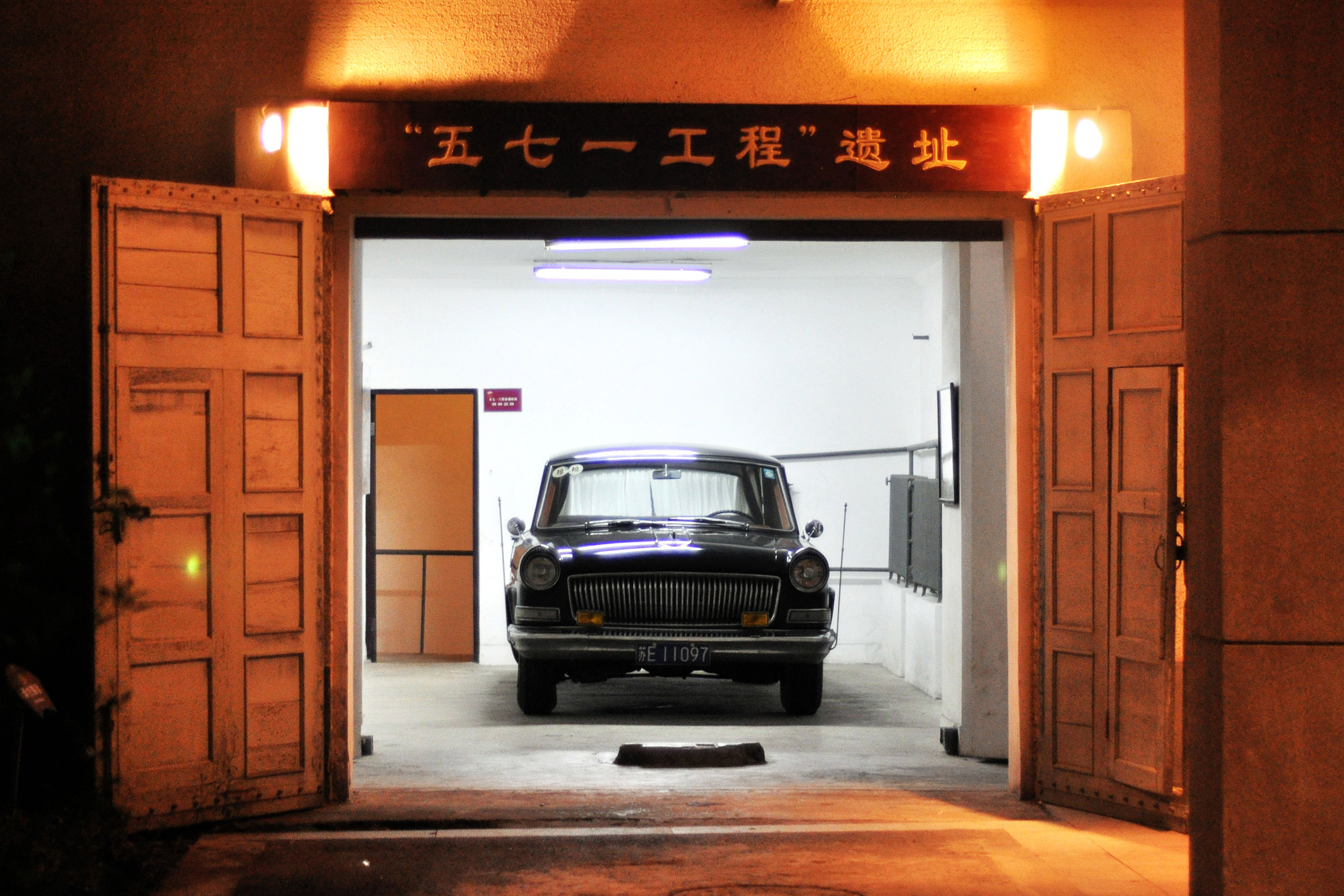
Site of Project 571 in Suzhou

Following Lin's death in 1971, the Chinese government initially charged him with personally planning Project 571. After the testimony of Li Weixin (the only one of the alleged plotters to have survived up to 1971), and the 1980 testimony of General Huang Yongsheng (a former military chief-of-staff whose role in the plot was implied by Li's testimony), sources within China have generally come to recognize that Lin Liguo devised the plot independently of Lin Biao. Western scholars have been critical of the Chinese government's perspective since 1971, and generally state that Lin Liguo was the author of the plot. Some Western historians question whether Lin Biao was even aware of Lin Liguo's plans at all.

According to a modern standard Chinese narrative of Lin Biao's plot, he became aware that Mao no longer trusted him after the Second Plenum of the 9th National Congress of the Chinese Communist Party in 1970, and he harbored a strong desire to seize supreme power. In February 1971, Lin and his wife Ye Qun (who was then a Politburo member) began to plot Mao's assassination.

In March 1971, Lin Liguo held a secret meeting with his closest followers at an Air Force base in Shanghai, which he termed it as "United Flotilla". At this alleged meeting, Lin Liguo and his subordinates supposedly drafted Project 571. Later that March, the group met again to formalize the structure of command following the proposed coup. The other major plotters were high-ranking military officers, Zhou Yuchi, Yu Xinye, and Li Weixin among others in the PLA Air Force.

From March 23 to 24, Yu Xinye drafted the outline for Project 571, the original manuscript of which was said to have been recovered after the death of the coup plotters. In the outline, Lin Liguo's party stated that the political situation after the Second Plenum Session of the 9th Central Committee in August 1970 was unstable, and accused the ruling clique as "corrupt and incompetent" and that Mao "did not trust Lin Biao at all". Therefore, they should "use the military first to gain control, overthrow the feudal dynasty that was flying the flag of socialism and seize power". It listed a number of ways to eliminate Mao Zedong: among them were attacking his train with flamethrowers or with an anti-aircraft gun aimed to shoot horizontally, blowing up an oil depot near the tracks or dynamiting a bridge which his train had to cross, bombing the train with a missile or a face-to-face assassination with a pistol.

One of the documents later found by the official investigation committee reflected Lin Liguo's view on Mao:

Today he uses this force to attack that force; tomorrow he uses that force to attack this force. Today he uses sweet words and honeyed talk to those he entices, and tomorrow he put them to death for some fabricated crimes. Those who are his guests today will be his prisoners tomorrow.

Looking back at the history for the past few decades, is there anyone he supported initially who had not finally been handed a political death sentence? Is there a single political force which has been able to work with him from beginning to end? His former secretaries have either committed suicide or been arrested. His few closest comrades-in-arms or trusted aides have also been sent to prison.

He is a paranoid and sadist. His philosophy of liquidating people is either don't do it or do it thoroughly. Every time he liquidates someone, he will put them to death before he desists; once he hurt you, he will hurt you all the way; and he puts the blame for all the bad things on others.

The plotters at first discussed plans on arresting Zhang Chunqiao and Yao Wenyuan. The idea of assassinating Mao, codenamed "B-52", allegedly arose when Mao made the decision to tour China's southern provinces in mid-August 1971.

Mao was unaware of the coup plot, but in August of 1971 he scheduled a Politburo conference for October to determine the political fate of Lin Biao. On August 15, Mao left Beijing to discuss the issue with other senior political and military leaders in southern China. During the trip, Mao made provocative anti-Lin speeches 13 times to civilian and military cadres. On September 5, Lin received reports that Mao was preparing to purge him. On September 8, Lin decided to speed up the coup with a note that was alleged written by Lin Biao and gave the order to his subordinates to proceed with Mao's assassination, under the direction of Lin Liguo and Zhang Yuchi (who was then the deputy director of the Office of the Air Force Headquarters).

Lin's subordinates planned to assassinate Mao by sabotaging his train before he returned to Beijing, but Mao, after leaving Hangzhou unexpectedly changed his route on September 11, only stopping briefly in Shanghai (where he had intended to spend a couple of days there) to meet General Xu Shiyou and returning straight to Beijing without stopping, before any plans could realistically be implemented. The reasons differ among historians on how Mao avoided the alleged coup; with either the conspirators were insufficiently determined to kill Mao, or strikingly incompetent, or that Mao was paranoid or had perhaps been forewarned. The Chairman had received word on September 8 of unusual activity at the PLA Air Force headquarters when Lin went to Beijing to finalize his plans with his conspirators and Mao's security was reinforced. By failing to assassinate Mao, the coup attempt associated with Project 571 failed.

After realizing that their coup attempt had failed, Lin's party first considered fleeing south to their power base in Guangzhou, where they would establish an alternative power base and cooperate with the Soviet Union to attack the armed forces still loyal to Mao. After hearing that Premier Zhou Enlai was investigating the incident, they abandoned this plan as impractical, and decided to flee to the Soviet Union instead. In the early morning of September 13, Lin Biao, Ye Qun, Lin Liguo, and most of the other major plotters attempted to flee to the Soviet Union and boarded a prearranged Trident 1-E, (a CAAC B-256) piloted by Pan Jingyin, the deputy commander of the PLAAF 34th division. The plane crashed near Öndörkhaan in Mongolia on September 13, 1971. Everyone on board, eight men and one woman, were killed. Lin's other co-conspirators Zhou Yuchi, Yu Xinye and Li Weixin tried to escape by helicopter but was foiled by the pilot and forced to land at the outskirts of Beijing. After shooting the pilot dead, in desperation, Zhou Yuchi and Yu Xinye committed suicide while Li Weixin was arrested by the PLA forces tasked in hunting them down.

After September 12, a massive purge of the armed forces took place. All military officials identified as being close to Lin or his family (most of China's high military command) were purged within weeks of Lin's disappearance. Within a month of Lin's disappearance, over 1,000 senior Chinese military officials were purged. After he was confident that all of the alleged plotters were either dead or arrested, Mao Zedong had copies of the Project 571 outline widely circulated among cadres in the Chinese Communist Party (relatively senior members only: level 19 and above). The official Chinese version of events was drafted by Zhang Chunqiao and his subordinates under Mao's personal supervision.

== Codes used in the outline ==
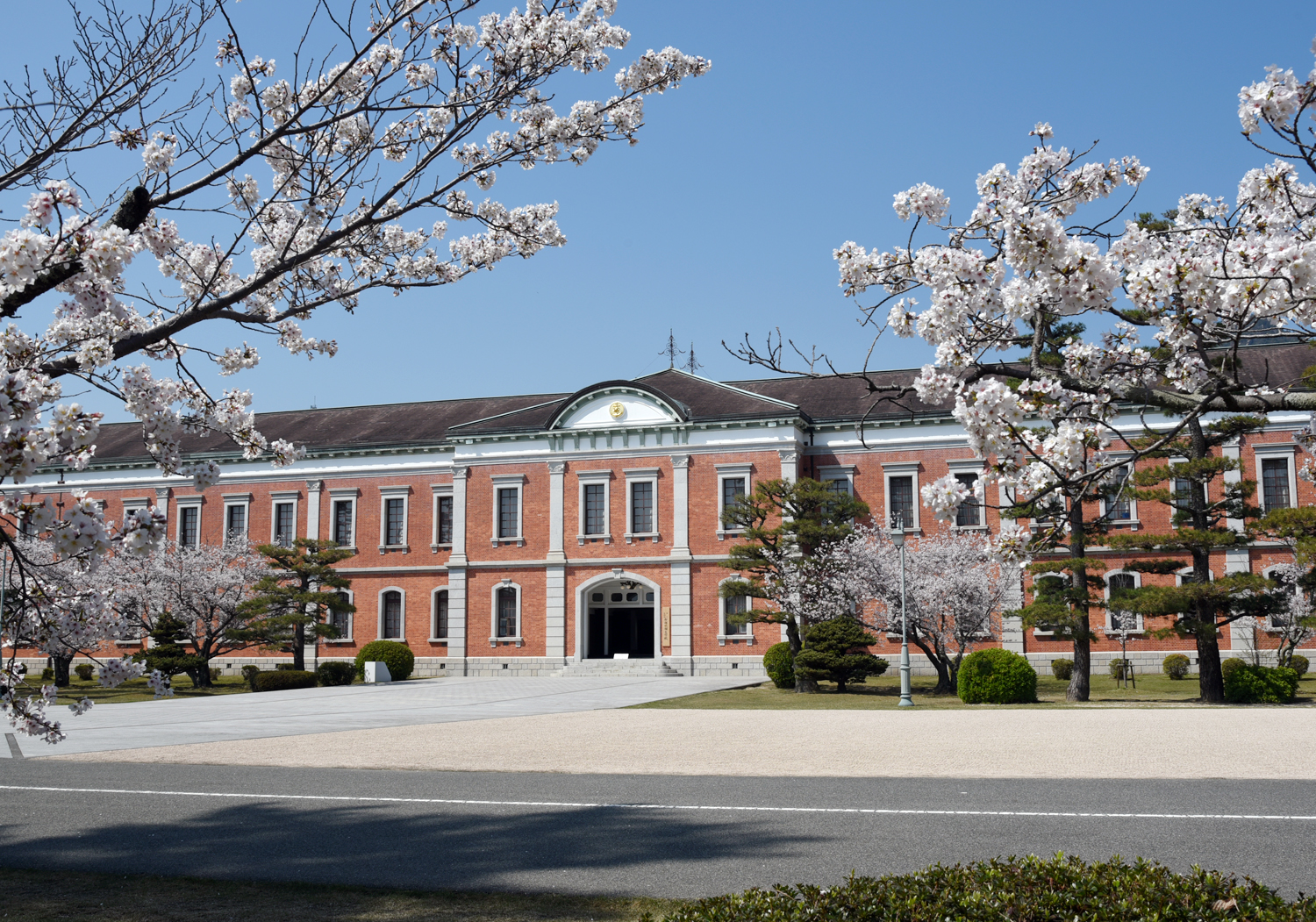
Lin was greatly inspired by transitional spirit of IJN Academy on Etajima

- "B-52" referred to Mao Zedong, also alluded his intention to contact the U.S. government or like the American long-range bomber, set off political explosions from a great height.
- "Enemy Capital Ship" (敌主力舰 dí zhǔlì jiàn) referred to Mao's supporters.
- "Trotskyist Writers" (笔杆子托派 bǐgǎnzi Tuō Pài) referred to Zhang Chunqiao and Yao Wenyuan
- "Wang, Chen and Jiang" (王、陈、江) were Wang Weiguo, Chen Liyun and Jiang Tengjiao, some of Lin Biao's supporters.
- "Project 01" (01工程 líng yī gōngchéng) references a dispatch telegraph whose design was masterminded by Lin Liguo.
- Etajima (江田岛), site of the Imperial Japanese Naval Academy where naval cadets were indoctrinated in the spiritual training of Bushido.
- "Death before dishonor" (不成功便成仁 bù chénggōng biàn chéngrén), a slogan that Chiang Kai-shek used to train his cadres.
- China itself was referred to as a "feudal dynasty disguised as a socialist country".

== Aftermath ==
It is generally believed that the criticism of Mao Zedong in the "Project 571" was extremely damaging to Mao Zedong's personal image. Therefore, there were different opinions within the Politburo Standing Committee of the Chinese Communist Party on whether to issue this Project to the public. However, Mao Zedong ignored the dissuasion of Zhou Enlai and others and insisted on publishing the full text of the Project. Regardless of Mao Zedong's motives, this objectively played an enlightening role in revealing the inside story of the Cultural Revolution, and its potential impact was very far-reaching.

A few years later, language similar to the relevant words in the minutes appeared in the "April 5th" poem in Tiananmen Square in early April 1976. For example, a famous poem in Tiananmen Square at that time wrote: "China is no longer the China of the past, and the people are not stupid. The feudal society of Qin Shi Huang is gone forever. We believe in Marxism-Leninism, and what we want is the true Marxism-Leninism." This poem is obviously influenced by the Project 571 from its thinking to its text. Eventually the Cultural Revolution ended with the death of Mao Zedong and the arrest of the Gang of Four.

== See also ==
- Criticize Lin, Criticize Confucius
- Lin Biao incident

== Bibliography ==
- Hannam, Peter, and Lawrence, Susan V. "Solving a Chinese Puzzle: Lin Biao's Final Days and Death, After Two Decades of Intrigue". U.S. News & World Report. January 23, 1994. Retrieved November 21, 2011.
- He, Henry Yuhuai. Dictionary of the Political Thought of the People's Republic of China. United States of America: East Gate. 2001. ISBN 0-7656-0569-4. Retrieved November 12, 2011.
- Qiu, Jin (June 2002). "Distorting History: Lessons From The Lin Biao Incident". Quest. 3 (2). Archived from the original on July 17, 2012.
- Uhalley Jr., Stephen; Qiu, Jin (Autumn 1993). "The Lin Biao Incident: More Than Twenty Years Later". Pacific Affairs. 66 (3): 386–398. doi:10.2307/2759617. JSTOR 2759617.
- MacFarquhar, Roderick; Schoenhals, Michael (2006). Mao's Last Revolution. Cambridge, Mass: Belknap Press. ISBN 978-0-674-02332-1. OCLC 64427572.
- Short, Philip (1999). Mao: A Life. London: Hodder & Stoughton. ISBN 0-340-75198-3.
