= Changli County =

Changli County 昌黎县
- County
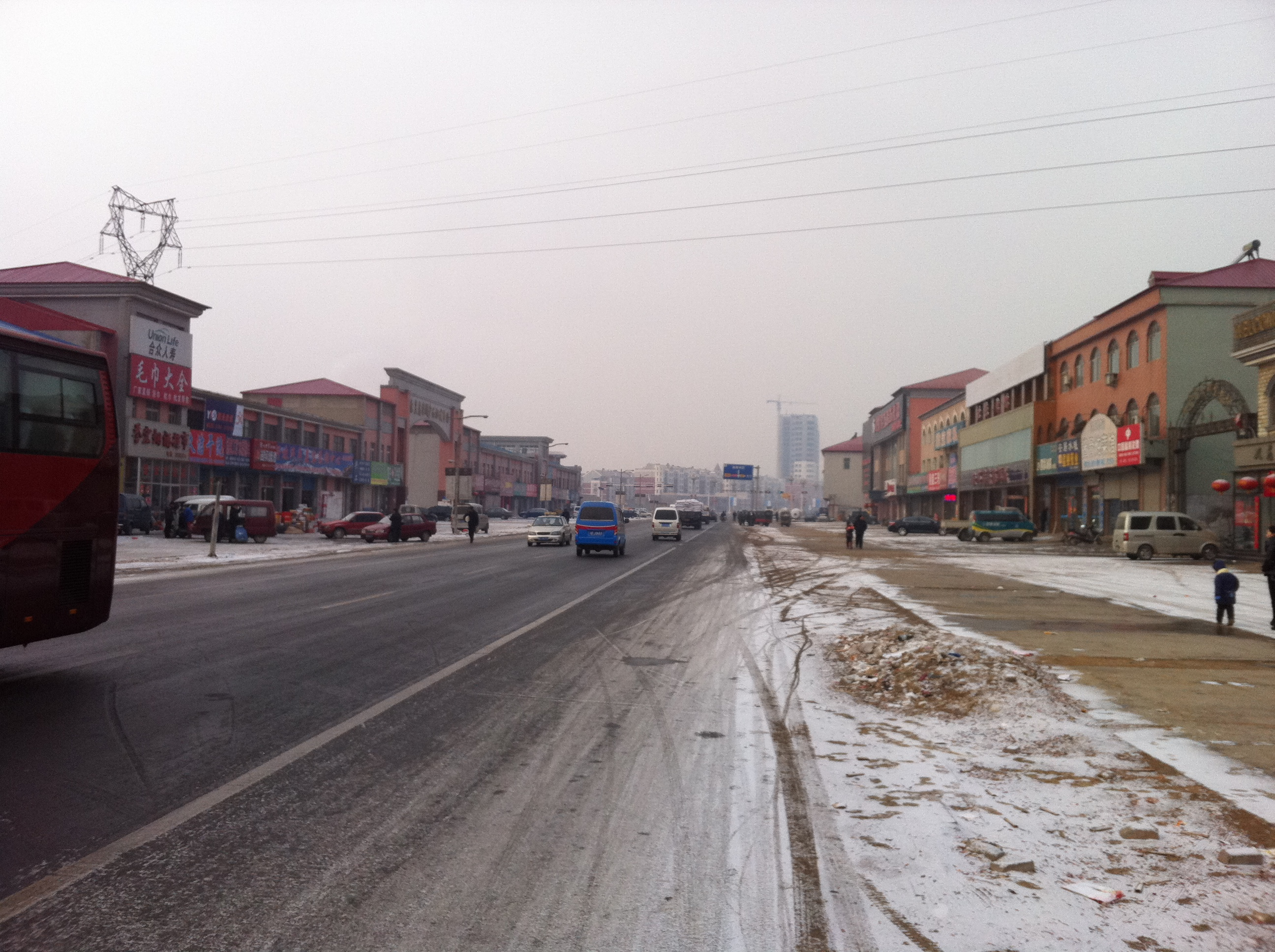

- Location in Hebei
- Coordinates: 39°43′N 119°10′E
- Country: People's Republic of China
- Province: Hebei
- Prefecture-level city: Qinhuangdao
- County seat: Changli Town (昌黎镇)
- Elevation: 22 m (72 ft)

Population (2020 census)
  - Total: 487,989
- Time zone: UTC+8 (China Standard)
- Website: http://www.changli.gov.cn/

Changli (Chinese: 昌黎; pinyin: Chānglí) is a county of northeastern Hebei province, China, with some Bohai Sea coast. It is under the administration of the Qinhuangdao City, and borders Funing County and Luan County. Both Beijing–Harbin Railway and China National Highway 205 pass through this county. According to the 2020 Chinese census, it has a population of 487,989 as of 2020.

Changli is one of the largest of China's winemaking districts, with 80 per cent of the county's tillable land used for growing Cabernet Sauvignon grapes. For this reason, Changli is sometimes called China's "Bordeaux region".

== Administrative divisions ==
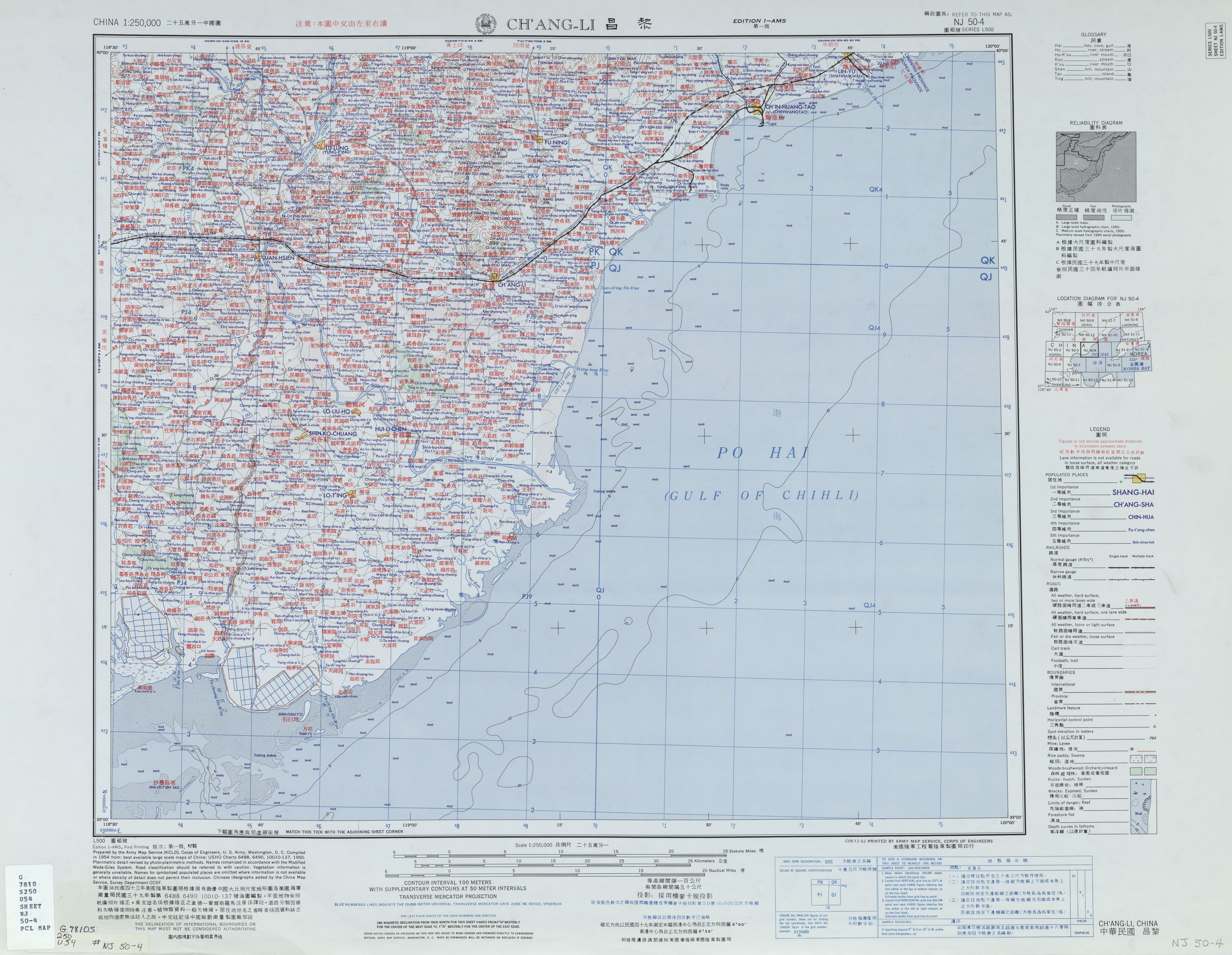
Changli (labelled as CH'ANG-LI 昌黎) (1954)

The county administers 11 towns and 5 townships.

Towns:

- Changli (昌黎镇)
- Jing'an (靖安镇)
- Anshan (安山镇)
- Longjiadian (龙家店镇)
- Nijing (泥井镇)
- Dapuhe (大蒲河镇)
- Xinji (新集镇)
- Liutaizhuang (刘台庄镇)
- Ruhe Town (茹荷镇)
- Zhugezhuang (朱各庄镇)
- Huangtianzhuang (荒佃庄镇)

Townships:

- Tuanlin Township (团林乡)
- Getiaogang Township (葛条港乡)
- Matuodian Township (马坨店乡)
- Liangshan Township (两山乡)
- Shilipu Township (十里铺乡)

== Climate ==
Climate data for Changli, elevation 18 m (59 ft), (1991–2020 normals, extremes 1981–present)
Month	Jan	Feb	Mar	Apr	May	Jun	Jul	Aug	Sep	Oct	Nov	Dec	Year
Record high °C (°F)	12.5 (54.5)	19.1 (66.4)	28.8 (83.8)	31.5 (88.7)	36.2 (97.2)	39.4 (102.9)	38.5 (101.3)	37.3 (99.1)	35.3 (95.5)	31.4 (88.5)	21.5 (70.7)	14.6 (58.3)	39.4 (102.9)
Mean daily maximum °C (°F)	0.9 (33.6)	3.9 (39.0)	11.8 (53.2)	18.9 (66.0)	25.4 (77.7)	28.1 (82.6)	29.8 (85.6)	29.9 (85.8)	26.2 (79.2)	19.2 (66.6)	9.9 (49.8)	2.8 (37.0)	17.2 (63.0)
Daily mean °C (°F)	−4.6 (23.7)	−1.8 (28.8)	5.7 (42.3)	13.0 (55.4)	19.7 (67.5)	23.0 (73.4)	25.7 (78.3)	25.3 (77.5)	20.7 (69.3)	13.4 (56.1)	4.8 (40.6)	−2.2 (28.0)	11.9 (53.4)
Mean daily minimum °C (°F)	−9.4 (15.1)	−6.7 (19.9)	0.2 (32.4)	7.3 (45.1)	14.1 (57.4)	18.3 (64.9)	21.8 (71.2)	21.2 (70.2)	15.5 (59.9)	7.6 (45.7)	−0.1 (31.8)	−6.7 (19.9)	6.9 (44.5)
Record low °C (°F)	−22.7 (−8.9)	−18.1 (−0.6)	−10.9 (12.4)	−3.0 (26.6)	4.4 (39.9)	9.1 (48.4)	15.6 (60.1)	13.0 (55.4)	2.3 (36.1)	−4.2 (24.4)	−12.9 (8.8)	−18.4 (−1.1)	−22.7 (−8.9)
Average precipitation mm (inches)	2.4 (0.09)	4.9 (0.19)	8.4 (0.33)	27.6 (1.09)	47.6 (1.87)	91.2 (3.59)	171.3 (6.74)	154.1 (6.07)	53.0 (2.09)	31.2 (1.23)	13.3 (0.52)	3.7 (0.15)	608.7 (23.96)
Average precipitation days (≥ 0.1 mm)	1.9	2.4	3.3	5.9	7.4	10.3	12.0	9.7	6.8	4.9	3.5	2.2	70.3
Average snowy days	3.2	3.0	1.6	0.4	0	0	0	0	0	0	1.8	3.3	13.3
Average relative humidity (%)	51	51	49	50	55	69	78	77	68	59	56	52	60
Mean monthly sunshine hours	219.3	213.1	266.2	273.6	298.4	258.9	231.4	254.8	258.6	243.0	204.7	207.1	2,929.1
Percentage possible sunshine	73	70	72	68	67	58	51	61	70	71	69	71	67
Source: China Meteorological Administrationall-time August highOctober all-time Record

== Notable people ==
- Zhang Guangming (1913–2016) veteran fighter pilot of the War of Resistance-World War II, and Major General of the Chinese Air Force
