= Qinhuangdao Shanhaiguan Airport =

Military airport in Hebei, China

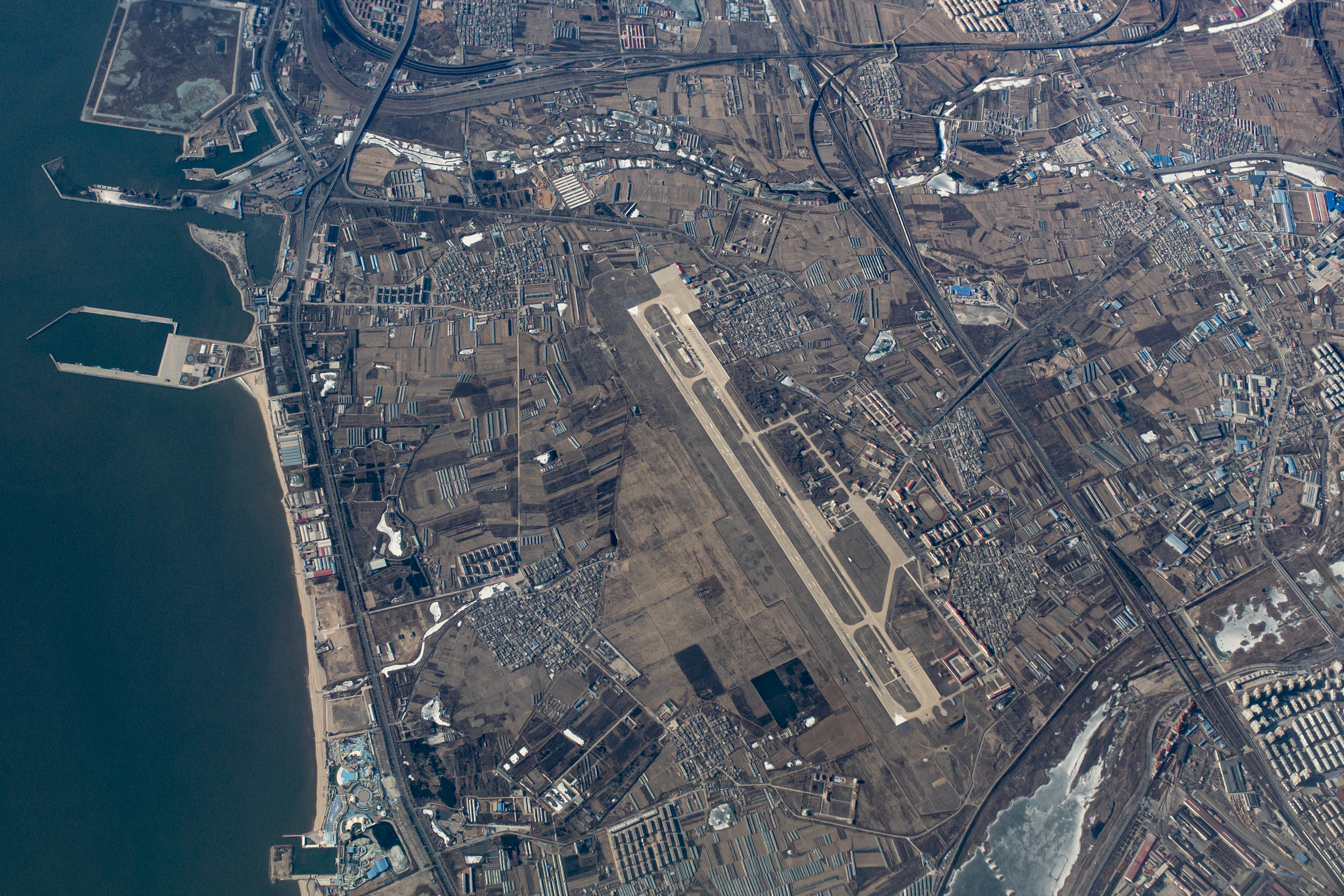
- IATA: ~~SHP~~; ICAO: ZBSH

Summary
- Airport type: Military
- Serves: Qinhuangdao, Hebei
- Location: Shanhaiguan District, Qinhuangdao
- Opened: 15 April 1985; 41 years ago
- Passenger services ceased: 31 March 2016
- Coordinates: 39°58′05″N 119°43′52″E

Map
- Location in Hebei

Runways
Direction	Length		Surface
Direction	m	ft	Surface
06/24	2,500	8,202	Asphalt

Statistics (2015)
- Passengers: 156,000

Qinhuangdao Shanhaiguan Airport
- Simplified Chinese: 秦皇岛山海关机场
- Traditional Chinese: 秦皇島山海關機場
Transcriptions
Standard Mandarin
- Hanyu Pinyin: Qínhuángdǎo Shānhǎiguān Jīchǎng

Qinhuangdao Shanhaiguan Airport (IATA: ~~SHP~~, ICAO: ZBSH) is a military airport in Qinhuangdao, Hebei Province, China. It is located in Shanhaiguan District, 15 kilometres (9.3 mi) from the city center. From 1985 to 2016 Shanhaiguan Airport also served as the civilian airport for Qinhuangdao. On 31 March 2016, the newly built Qinhuangdao Beidaihe Airport started operation and all civil flights were transferred to the new airport.

== History ==
On 13 September 1971, Marshall Lin Biao, China's Vice Premier and Minister of Defense, attempted to flee China in his Hawker Siddeley Trident from Shanhaiguan Airport, allegedly following a failed coup attempt. The plane then crashed in Mongolia, killing all nine people on board, including Lin, his wife Ye Qun, and their son Lin Liguo.

Shanhaiguan Airport was opened to civil flights on 15 April 1985. During its three decades of operation, it operated flights to more than 20 Chinese cities. For a time starting in 2007, it temporarily operated international flights to Yakutsk and Blagoveshchensk in Russia. Throughout the thirty years the airport maintained a perfect safety record.

Although Shanhaiguan Airport was expanded in preparation for the 2008 Beijing Olympics, its status as a military airport limited its potential for further growth. As a result, the new Qinhuangdao Beidaihe Airport was proposed in 2004, and received approval from the State Council in July 2009. Construction for the new airport officially began in April 2012, and was completed in 2016. On 31 March 2016, Beidaihe Airport started operation, and all civil flights were transferred to the new airport. Shanhaiguan Airport reverted to sole military use, although there are plans to use it for general aviation. In 2015, its last full year of operation, Shanhaiguan Airport served 156,000 passengers.

== Facilities ==
The airport has a single runway that is 2,500 metres (8,200 ft) long (class 4C). It can handle mid-sized passenger jets such as the Boeing 737 and the Airbus A320. It has six aircraft parking aprons, and 200 car parking spaces.

== See also ==
- List of airports in China
- List of the busiest airports in China
- List of People's Liberation Army Air Force airbases
