= Yang Jisheng =

Yang Jisheng may refer to:

- Yang Jisheng (Ming dynasty) (1516–1555), Ming dynasty official and Confucian martyr
- Yang Jisheng (journalist) (born 1940), Chinese journalist
