= Criticize Lin, Criticize Confucius =

Political and intellectual campaign started by Mao Zedong

A poster from 1974 by Zhang Yan (张延). It reads "Criticize Lin, criticize Confucius – it's the most important matter for the whole party, the whole army and the people of the whole country."

The Criticize Lin (Biao), Criticize Confucius Campaign (simplified Chinese: 批林批孔运动; traditional Chinese: 批林批孔運動; pinyin: pī lín pī kǒng yùndòng; also called the Anti-Lin Biao, Anti-Confucius campaign) was a political and intellectual campaign started by Mao Zedong and his wife, Jiang Qing, the leader of the Gang of Four. It lasted from 1973 until the end of the Cultural Revolution, in 1976.

The campaign continued in several phases, beginning as an academic attempt to interpret Chinese history according to Mao's political theories. In 1974 the campaign was joined with another pre-existent campaign to criticise Lin Biao, who had allegedly attempted to assassinate Mao in a failed coup before his death in 1971. In early 1975 the campaign was modified to indirectly criticise China's Premier, Zhou Enlai, and other senior Chinese leaders. In mid-1975 the Gang of Four introduced a debate on Water Margin as a tool for criticism of their opponents. The campaign ended in 1976, when the Gang of Four were arrested.

== Stages of the campaign ==
The events that occurred during the "Criticize Lin, Criticize Confucius" campaign were "complex and often confusing", but can be identified as occurring through four main phases. The first phase of the campaign began after the 1st Plenary Session of the 10th Central Committee of the Chinese Communist Party, in 1973. Following this session, Mao encouraged public discussions focused on criticizing Confucius and Confucianism, and on interpreting aspects of historical Chinese society within a Maoist theoretical perspective.

These initial debates focused on interpreting the issues of slavery, feudalism, and the relationship between Confucianism and Legalism according to the social theories published by Mao and Karl Marx. Confucius himself was condemned as a defender of slavery and a denigrator of women who had hindered China's development by resisting historical progress.

In late 1973 to early 1974, the second phase of the campaign began, when the Chinese public were encouraged to adopt criticism of Confucius in a great "study campaign". The universities were mobilized to deliver special courses to workers and peasants; state propaganda photographs depicted Chinese farmers supposedly carrying on "intense debates".

The criticisms of Confucius merged with a pre-existent campaign to criticize Lin Biao, who was condemned as a "capitalist roader" by his enemies among a radical faction of the Party led by Jiang Qing. With the deployment of the campaign it became clear that "criticism of Lin Biao and Confucius" was directed not so much against the "enemies of the past," as against the "enemies of today." During this phase, Mao's image was identified with that of China's first emperor, Qin Shi Huang (glossed as an anti-Confucian Legalist). Praise was given to Qin based on his popular association with Mao. Mao described Lin as a "closeted Confucianist", "bourgeois careerist", conspirator, and "ultra-rightist".

Revolutionary operas were used as an ideological tool during the campaign, and their promotion through official state channels surged in 1974.

The third phase began after Zhou Enlai reorganized the State Council during the 4th National People's Congress, in January 1975. At the People's Congress, Zhou brought many cadres back to work who had been forced out of power during the 1966–1969 phase of the Cultural Revolution. In comparison with the first stage of the Cultural Revolution, the rehabilitated leaders led by Zhou were able to exercise significant influence.

Feeling strong support from his supporters on 31 January 1974 at the enlarged meeting of the Politburo, Zhou was able to strongly request not to involve the armed forces in a campaign for "four great freedoms", namely, writing, free expression of opinions and extensive discussion, and general criticism. Deng Xiaoping, who was among those rehabilitated under Zhou, sought to turn the campaign back against the radical faction by linking Confucius to resistance to modernisation and better education – goals that Deng was pursuing at the time, against the radicals' opposition.

Because they had supported the purging of many career Communist Party veterans during the early Cultural Revolution, the radical faction, now dominated by the Gang of Four, opposed Zhou's efforts and began to subtly criticize him and his policies. In particular, they used the ongoing anti-Confucius campaign to attack the 12th century BC Duke of Zhou, a major figure in Confucianism, whose name recalled that of Zhou Enlai.

The fourth and final phase of the campaign coincided with Zhou's illness and hospitalization. After 1974, the campaign against Lin Biao and Confucius reached its climax, and soon subsided. However, beginning in the summer of 1975 the Gang of Four started a new campaign, introducing public debates on the Water Margin and the "war on empiricism" as a tool to criticise Zhou and their other enemies, notably Deng, which sidelined "criticism of Confucius." Deng Xiaoping then took many of Zhou's responsibilities, acting as premier in Zhou's absence until Deng was again forced out of power, in 1976.

After Mao died, the Gang of Four also directed a campaign against Hua Guofeng, who was named Mao's successor. The campaign ended with Hua's arrest of the Gang of Four, in October 1976. The Anti-Lin, Anti-Confucius campaign was the last campaign of the Maoist era, and with the demise of the Gang of Four, such campaigns were largely abandoned as a feature of Chinese politics.

== Theoretical focus ==
A main theoretical focus of the campaign was to advance the principle articulated by Mao that the masses are the motive force of history.

Although the campaign was used as a political tool by the Gang of Four, it did produce a genuine attempt to interpret historical Chinese society within the context of Mao's political theories. Maoist theorists attempted to use what they knew about the stone-age Dawenkou culture to produce evidence that a slave society had existed in Chinese history, just as Mao had described. These Maoist theorists used the recurrent patterns of peasant revolts, which have occurred throughout Chinese history, as evidence that the common people had consistently rejected both feudalism and the Confucian ideology that supported it. After their vitriolic denunciations of Confucianism, radical theorists attempted to interpret all of Chinese history as a long episode of conflict between the forces of Confucianism and Legalism, and attempted to identify themselves as modern Legalists.

During the campaign, critique groups formed at Tsinghua University and Peking University; they produced commentaries under the name "Liang Xiao," a pseudonym that sounds like a person's name but which is a homophone for "two schools."

The campaign was an intense moment in 20th Century Chinese intellectual history, combining both specialist scholarship and with an openness to mass study. There was a spike in new political economy texts produced for a lay audience (as opposed to party members or university students), and mass dissemination of information made thousands of documents and articles available to ordinary Chinese, including worker-formed study "groups for theory" in factories. Workers writing groups also collaborated with specialists on drafting texts, such as the 1976 Political Economy in Front of the Smelting Furnace (炼钢炉前的政治经济学) by the theory group of Shanghai Number 5 Steel Factory and the Fudan University philosophy and economics departments. Paradoxically, publications denouncing Confucius also had the impact of introducing many young Chinese to Confucian works. The campaign resulted in reprints and new editions of classic Legalist writings as well as historical reconstructions of their debates with the Confucians. It also provided the impetus for archeological excavations.

== Local level ==
Ordinary people in China generally viewed the campaign as an attack on elitism in China's Confucian tradition, particularly given the campaign's denunciation of the Confucian principle that it is a general rule that the elites are respectable and the ordinary people are stupid.

During the campaign, some dormant radicals on the local level resumed political activities, one such example was the Hangzhou incident of 1975, which was put down with a massive deployment of troops.

== See also ==
- List of campaigns of the Chinese Communist Party
- Yang Rongguo

== Bibliography ==
- Hsiung, James C. "'Lin Biao and the Gang of Four' by Tien-wei Wu". The China Quarterly. No.99, Sept.1984. pp. 637–638. Retrieved December 15, 2011.
- Spence, Jonathan D. (2013). The search for modern China (3rd ed.). New York: W.W. Norton & Company. ISBN 978-0-393-93451-9.
