= Beidaihe, Qinhuangdao =

District in Qinhuangdao, Hebei, China

Beidaihe 北戴河区 Pehtaiho
- District
- Beidaihe District
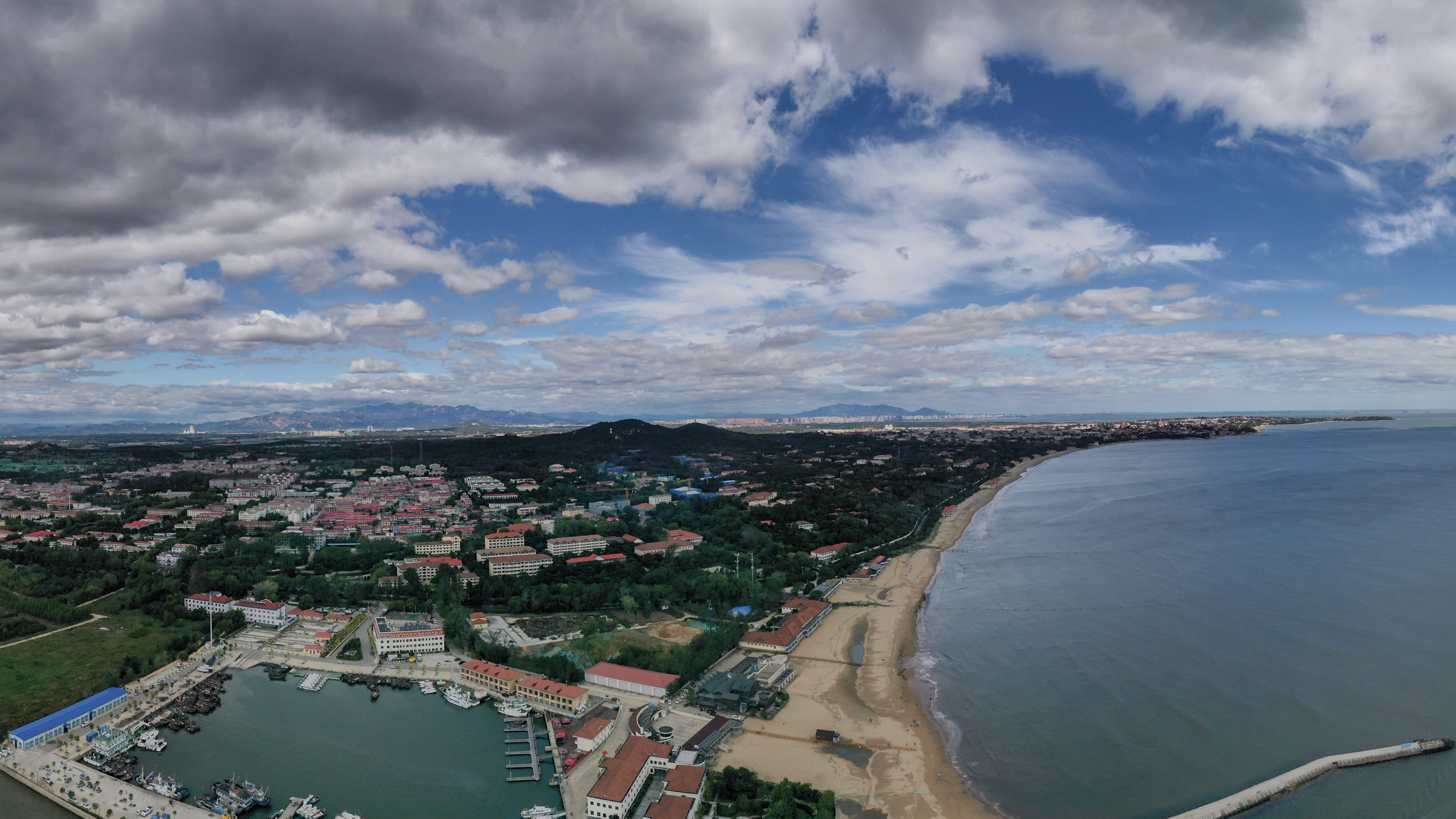
- Beidaihe aerial view
- Interactive map of Beidaihe
- Coordinates: 39°50′05″N 119°29′04″E
- Country: People's Republic of China
- Province: Hebei
- Prefecture-level city: Qinhuangdao
- District seat: Xishan Subdistrict (西山街道)

Area
  - Total: 70.14 km^{2} (27.08 sq mi)
- Elevation: 13 m (43 ft)

Population (2020 census)
  - Total: 130,104
  - Density: 1,855/km^{2} (4,804/sq mi)
- Time zone: UTC+8 (China Standard)
- Website: www.beidaihe.gov.cn

Beidaihe District (Chinese: 北戴河区; pinyin: Běidàihé Qū; Wade–Giles: Pei Tai Ho) is a popular beach resort and a district of the city of Qinhuangdao, Hebei province on China's Bohai Sea coast. It has an area of 70.14 km^{2} (27.08 sq mi) and, as of 2020, a population of 130,104, as well as a coastline of 22.5 km (14.0 mi). It is also known as a birding haven.

The Beidaihe Beach Resort stretches 10 km (6.2 mi) from east to west, from the Yinjiao Pavilion to the mouth of the Daihe River. The beach itself is covered with fine yellow sand stretching some 100 metres to the sea. The water is shallow. Mount Lianfeng near the beach has two peaks covered by abundant green pines and cypresses. Lush vegetation, caves, decorated pavilions, secluded paths, and winding bridges have made it attractive to visitors from throughout China.

== History ==
=== Early history ===
In the early Ming dynasty, it belonged to Pingluan Prefecture of Shandong Province. In 1369, it was reassigned to Beiping Province; in 1371, it was renamed Yongping Prefecture. In Yongle era, it came under the Beijing Regional Administration; in 1421, it was placed directly under the capital and administered as Funing County of Yongping Prefecture.

During the Qing dynasty, it belonged to Funing County of Yongping Prefecture under Yongping Circuit, Zhili Province. In 1737, during the Qianlong era, it was reassigned to Linyu County of Yongping Prefecture.

=== 19th century ===
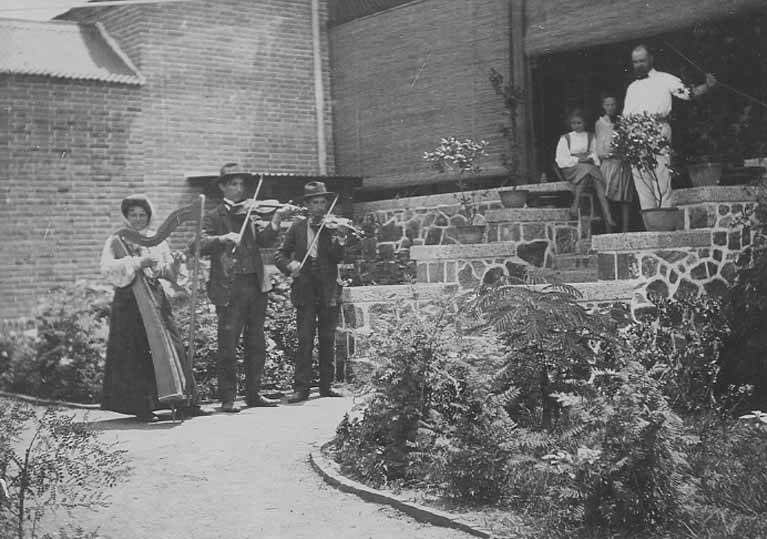
Russian musicians playing outside of their villas, 1905

During the Guangxu reign of the Qing dynasty, many foreigners living in Beijing requested permission to build villas in this area. In 1898, the Qing government officially designated Beidaihe as a "summer resort for people of all nations." By 1949, there were 719 villas built in Beidaihe.

=== Summer resort in PRC ===
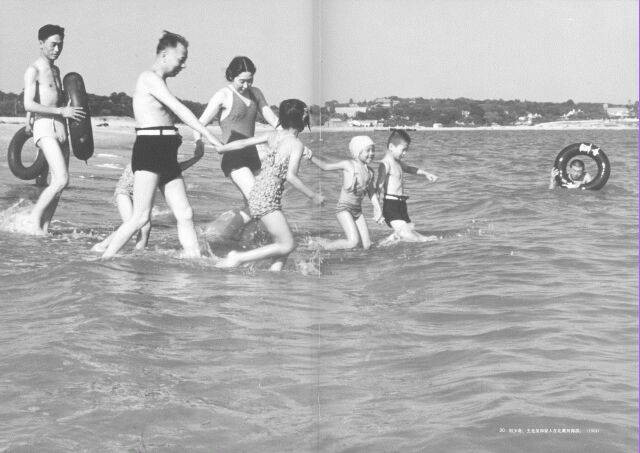
Liu Shaoqi, Wang Guangmei and their kids in Beidaihe

Because of its proximity to the capital, Beidaihe has been the location of many important official conferences, and has become well known as the Chinese Communist Party (CCP)'s summer retreat. It is still commonly used by the CCP's highest leadership each July to slip away from the summer heat of Beijing and to plan important strategies in the privacy that Beidaihe offers. "Beidaihe," an American diplomat once said, "is China's 'smoke-filled room.'"

After Mao Zedong led the CCP to power in 1949, the new rulers also developed a taste for seaside atmosphere. Mao himself had a summer resort here. Sanatoriums sprang up to reward the efforts of model workers from every industry. A very large Friendship Guesthouse was constructed in 1954, one of dozens across China, to receive the Soviet "elder brothers" who came to assist Chinese development prior to tensions emerging between Soviet and Chinese leadership. In 1954, when Mao was at Beidaihe, he wrote a famous poem, titled with Beidaihe:

A rainstorm sweeps down on the northern land,

White breakers leap to the sky.
No fishing boats off Qinhuangdao
Are seen on the boundless ocean.
Where are they gone?

Nearly two thousand years ago
Wielding his whip, the Emperor Weiwu
Rode eastward to Jieshi; his poem survives.
Today the autumn wind still sighs,
But the world has changed!

The most infamous event which occurred here involved Lin Biao, who on 13 September 1971, after he was accused of plotting a coup d'état, fled to his villa here with his wife and a son and boarded a plane for the Soviet Union at the local airport; the plane crashed in Mongolia, killing everyone on board.

These conferences were abandoned by order of Hu Jintao in 2003, mainly for two reasons. First, a conference in a resort area appeared to contradict Hu and Wen Jiabao's goal in projecting a frugal image for the party. Second, it was a desire of the leadership under Hu to work through formal party and state mechanisms rather than informal gatherings. However, the Beidaihe meetings resumed in July 2007, when political deliberation took place in anticipation of the 17th Party Congress.

== Administrative divisions ==
There are two subdistricts and two towns in Beidaihe.

=== Subdistricts ===
- Xishan Subdistrict (西山街道)
- Dongshan Subdistrict (东山街道)

=== Towns ===
- Haibin (海滨镇)
- Daihe (戴河镇)
- Niutouya (牛头崖镇)

== Climate ==
Climate data for Beidaihe District (1991–2020 normals)
Month	Jan	Feb	Mar	Apr	May	Jun	Jul	Aug	Sep	Oct	Nov	Dec	Year
Record high °C (°F)	12.7 (54.9)	18.3 (64.9)	25.6 (78.1)	33.4 (92.1)	34.2 (93.6)	40.0 (104.0)	37.8 (100.0)	35.7 (96.3)	34.2 (93.6)	29.5 (85.1)	21.4 (70.5)	14.2 (57.6)	40.0 (104.0)
Daily mean °C (°F)	−5.6 (21.9)	−2.7 (27.1)	3.7 (38.7)	11.0 (51.8)	17.3 (63.1)	21.3 (70.3)	24.7 (76.5)	24.4 (75.9)	19.8 (67.6)	12.4 (54.3)	3.9 (39.0)	−3.1 (26.4)	10.6 (51.0)
Record low °C (°F)	−26.0 (−14.8)	−18.9 (−2.0)	−13.1 (8.4)	−4.4 (24.1)	3.0 (37.4)	7.3 (45.1)	14.2 (57.6)	11.4 (52.5)	2.7 (36.9)	−6.4 (20.5)	−14.1 (6.6)	−17.7 (0.1)	−26.0 (−14.8)
Average precipitation mm (inches)	2.6 (0.10)	4.3 (0.17)	7.9 (0.31)	24.4 (0.96)	47.6 (1.87)	86.3 (3.40)	171.2 (6.74)	163.9 (6.45)	47.0 (1.85)	28.1 (1.11)	15.0 (0.59)	3.6 (0.14)	601.9 (23.69)
Source: Temperature and precipitation in Beidaihe District from 1991 to 2020
