= Chinggis City =

Capital city of Khentii Province, Mongolia

- District
- Kherlen District; Хэрлэн сум ᠬᠡᠷᠦᠯᠦᠨᠰᠤᠮᠤ
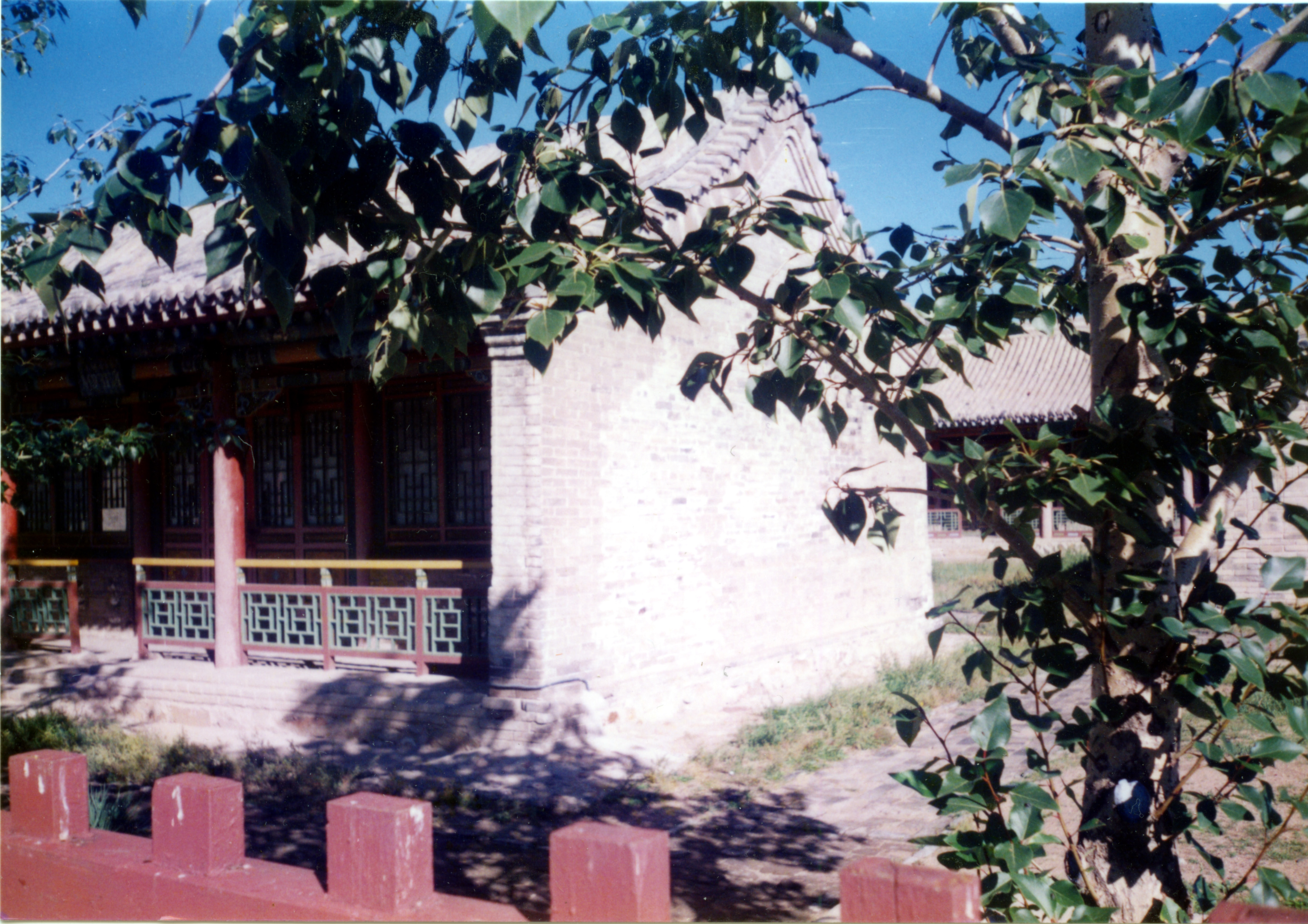
- In the Öndörkhaan Museum complex

- Location within Mongolia
- Coordinates: 47°19′N 110°39′E
- Country: Mongolia
- Province: Khentii Province

Area
  - Total: 3,788 km^{2} (1,463 sq mi)
- Elevation: 1,027 m (3,369 ft)

Population (2017)
  - Total: 20,935
  - Density: 5.527/km^{2} (14.31/sq mi)
- Time zone: UTC+8 (UTC + 8)

Chinggis City, formerly Öndörkhaan, is a town in Mongolia located 290 km east of Ulaanbaatar. On 18 November 2013, the city was renamed to Chinggis City from its former name of Öndörkhaan in honor of Genghis Khan, who was born and possibly buried in the same province north of the city. Chinggis City serves as the capital of Khentii Province.

== History ==
On 13 September 1971, Vice Chairman of the Chinese Communist Party Lin Biao died when a Hawker Siddeley Trident he was aboard crashed in Öndörkhaan.

== Geography and climate ==
=== Geography ===
Chinggis City shares its location with the Kherlen sum (municipality) and is the most populous part of the Khentii province.

=== Climate ===
Chinggis City

Climate chart (precipitation, max. and min. temperature)
J	F	M	A	M	J	J	A	S	O	N	D
1 −15 −29	1 −9 −26	2 1 −15	4 12 −4	16 20 3	42 25 10	83 27 13	53 25 11	20 19 3	9 9 −6	4 −3 −17	2 −13 −26
- █ Average max. and min. temperatures in °C
- █ Precipitation totals in mm
- Source: Pogoda.ru.net
Imperial conversion
J	F	M	A	M	J	J	A	S	O	N	D
0 5 −20	0 16 −15	0.1 34 5	0.2 54 25	0.6 68 37	1.7 77 50	3.3 81 55	2.1 77 52	0.8 66 37	0.4 48 21	0.2 27 1	0.1 9 −15
- █ Average max. and min. temperatures in °F
- █ Precipitation totals in inches

Chinggis City experiences a semi-arid climate (Köppen BSk) with long, dry, frigid winters and short, very warm summers. It borders the Kherlen River and is located on a broad flat unprotected plain. In winter, when the river freezes over and the winds howl across the open steppe it can easily reach −40 °C or −40 °F without the subtraction of wind chill.

Climate data for Chinggis City, elevation 1,033 m (3,389 ft), (1991–2020 normals, extremes 1936–present)
Month	Jan	Feb	Mar	Apr	May	Jun	Jul	Aug	Sep	Oct	Nov	Dec	Year
Record high °C (°F)	0.0 (32.0)	10.6 (51.1)	22.6 (72.7)	30.7 (87.3)	35.8 (96.4)	39.0 (102.2)	41.0 (105.8)	40.4 (104.7)	34.0 (93.2)	27.8 (82.0)	14.7 (58.5)	7.5 (45.5)	41.0 (105.8)
Mean daily maximum °C (°F)	−15.6 (3.9)	−9.2 (15.4)	1.2 (34.2)	12.2 (54.0)	20.1 (68.2)	25.4 (77.7)	27.2 (81.0)	25.2 (77.4)	19.4 (66.9)	9.6 (49.3)	−3.6 (25.5)	−13.7 (7.3)	8.2 (46.7)
Daily mean °C (°F)	−23.5 (−10.3)	−18.4 (−1.1)	−7.5 (18.5)	3.7 (38.7)	11.7 (53.1)	17.8 (64.0)	20.3 (68.5)	17.9 (64.2)	11.1 (52.0)	1.1 (34.0)	−11.5 (11.3)	−20.8 (−5.4)	0.2 (32.3)
Mean daily minimum °C (°F)	−29.5 (−21.1)	−26.0 (−14.8)	−15.6 (3.9)	−4.5 (23.9)	3.0 (37.4)	10.1 (50.2)	13.8 (56.8)	11.1 (52.0)	3.3 (37.9)	−6.0 (21.2)	−17.9 (−0.2)	−26.6 (−15.9)	−7.1 (19.3)
Record low °C (°F)	−44.3 (−47.7)	−42.2 (−44.0)	−38.9 (−38.0)	−23.9 (−11.0)	−12.8 (9.0)	−2.2 (28.0)	1.4 (34.5)	−0.9 (30.4)	−10.2 (13.6)	−25.8 (−14.4)	−38.4 (−37.1)	−43 (−45)	−44.3 (−47.7)
Average precipitation mm (inches)	2 (0.1)	2 (0.1)	3 (0.1)	6 (0.2)	18 (0.7)	44 (1.7)	63 (2.5)	57 (2.2)	24 (0.9)	9 (0.4)	4 (0.2)	3 (0.1)	235 (9.2)
Average precipitation days (≥ 1.0 mm)	1.2	1.5	1.8	1.7	3.4	6.2	8.4	7.5	4.1	2.5	2.1	1.4	41.9
Average relative humidity (%)	73.7	69.8	57.0	40.3	38.9	48.7	58.9	61.2	55.5	56.0	66.1	74.0	58.3
Mean daily sunshine hours	6.2	7.5	8.5	8.9	9.7	9.8	9.1	9.0	8.7	7.7	6.5	5.6	8.1
Source 1: Pogoda.ru.net
Source 2: NOAA, Deutscher Wetterdienst (daily sun)

== Administrative divisions ==
The district is divided into eight bags, which are:

- Bayanmunkh
- Bulag
- Ishgen Tolgoi
- Kherlen
- Nomgon
- Sarig
- Tsogt-Undur
- Undurkhaan

== Economy ==
Coal mining is important to the economy of the town and Chandgana Tal coalfield is located 53 km W from Chinggis City.

There exists a major United Nations Development Programme (UNDP) Networking and Cluster Development project stationed in Chinggis City specializing in the strengthen of urban, peri-urban and rural business associations and networks so as to reduce the very high unemployment rates.

== Transportation ==
The Öndörkhaan Airport (UNR/ZMUH) has one unpaved runway and was serviced by regular flights from and to Ulaanbaatar, before the paved highway was completed.

The town serves as a transportation hub, linking Ulaanbaatar and Choibalsan.

== Sister city ==
- Hailar District, China.

== See also ==
- List of cities in Mongolia
