= Siliang =

Siliang could be a transliteration of two different Chinese-language given names. Notable people with the name include:

- Qian Siliang (Chinese: 錢思亮), Taiwanese chemist
- Tan Siliang (Chinese: 谭思亮), Chinese businessman
- Tao Siliang (Chinese: 陶斯亮), Chinese physician, politician, and philanthropist
