= Tao Zhu =

Chinese politician (1908–1969)

- 陶铸
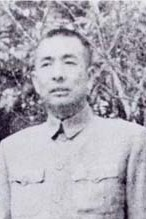
- Tao Zhu

Head of the Publicity Department of the Chinese Communist Party
- In office December 1966 – 1967
- Preceded by: Lu Dingyi
- Succeeded by: Geng Biao

Standing Secretary of the Secretariat of the Chinese Communist Party
- In office June 1966 – 1967
- Preceded by: New title
- Succeeded by: Position revoked

President of the Jinan University
- In office June 1958 – January 1963
- Preceded by: Li Shouyong
- Succeeded by: Chen Xujing

First Secretary of Guangdong
- In office July 1955 – February 1965
- Preceded by: Ye Jianying
- Succeeded by: Zhao Ziyang

Chairman of the Guangdong Provincial Committee of the Chinese People's Political Consultative Conference
- In office January 1955 – December 1960
- Preceded by: New title
- Succeeded by: Ou Mengjue

Governor of Guangdong
- In office September 1953 – August 1957
- Preceded by: Ye Jianying
- Succeeded by: Chen Yu

Political Commissar of the PLA Guangdong Military District
- In office June 1952 – July 1954
- Commander: Huang Yiping
- Preceded by: Tan Zheng
- Succeeded by: Song Weishi

Personal details
- Born: 16 January 1908 Qiyang County, Hunan, Qing China
- Died: 30 November 1969 (aged 61) Hefei, Anhui, China
- Party: Chinese Communist Party
- Spouse: Zeng Zhi (m. 1932; died 1969)
- Children: Tao Siliang
- Education: Whampoa Military Academy

Chinese name
- Simplified Chinese: 陶铸
- Traditional Chinese: 陶鑄
Transcriptions
Standard Mandarin
- Hanyu Pinyin: Táo Zhù
- Wade–Giles: T'ao Chu

Tao Jihua
- Simplified Chinese: 陶际华
- Traditional Chinese: 陶際華
Transcriptions
Standard Mandarin
- Hanyu Pinyin: Táo Jìhuá

Art name
- Simplified Chinese: 剑寒
- Traditional Chinese: 劍寒
Transcriptions
Standard Mandarin
- Hanyu Pinyin: Jiàn Hán

Tao Zhu (Chinese: 陶铸; pinyin: Táo Zhù; Wade–Giles: T'ao Chu; 16 January 1908 – 30 November 1969) was a Chinese Communist revolutionary and senior political leader who served as a member of the Politburo Standing Committee of the Chinese Communist Party. A veteran of the early Chinese Communist movement, he participated in the Nanchang and Guangzhou uprisings and held key leadership positions in various Chinese regions. After the founding of the People's Republic of China, Tao held prominent roles including Vice Premier of the State Council, becoming a major figure in both party and military affairs. He was purged during the Cultural Revolution and placed under strict house arrest, dying in 1969 before being posthumously rehabilitated in 1978.

== Early life ==
Tao Zhu was born on 16 January 1908 into a poor intellectual family in Langshu village, Qiyang County, Hunan. His grandfather, Tao Yizhai, died young, and his grandmother ran the household. His father, Tao Tiezheng, a graduate of the Hengyang Southern Route Higher Normal School (now Hengyang Normal University), took part in the Wuchang Uprising of 1911, headed a transport bureau of the Hanyeping Company and co-owned a small coal mine. In 1914, at the age of six, Tao followed his father to study at a private school in Wuchang. In 1915, as Yuan Shikai intensified the repression of revolutionaries, his father moved the family back to Qiyang, where he and a friend founded a modern-style school, Wenchang Pavilion. Tao continued his primary education there under his father, who served as headmaster. In 1918, his father and his third uncle were killed by Xiao Yaonan, a subordinate of the Beiyang warlord Wu Peifu. Left impoverished, Tao had to leave school, and through relatives, he was apprenticed for several years.

== Revolutionary career ==
=== Whampoa and the early party ===
In 1926, Tao entered the fifth class of the Whampoa Military Academy in Guangzhou, and that year, he joined the Chinese Communist Party (CCP) on the introduction of his classmates Zhao Shijia, Chen Baohua and Zhan Buyan. In early April 1927, he was sent to Wuhan to join the propaganda team of the General Political Department of the National Revolutionary Army. After the collapse of the First United Front between the Kuomintang and the CCP, he joined the guard regiment of the Fourth Army and took part in the Nanchang Uprising and the Guangzhou Uprising.

In 1929, Tao served on the CCP's Fujian provincial committee as its secretary-general, its secretary and the head of its organisation department. In May 1930, he led a twelve-man raid on the prison in Xiamen that freed more than forty imprisoned Communists without loss to the raiders. More than twenty Nationalist guards were killed or wounded. The operation, known as the Xiamen prison break, attracted national attention. Later in 1930, he went to Zhangzhou to rebuild the party's Southern Fujian special committee, and in December, he oversaw the formation of the first detachment of the Southern Fujian Red Army guerrillas.

In 1933, Tao went to work for the party's central organs in Shanghai, where he was arrested by the Nationalist government. He was taken to the military police headquarters in Nanjing and sentenced to life imprisonment. In 1937, after negotiations between Zhou Enlai, Ye Jianying and the Nationalist government, Huang Wenjie secured the release of Tao and six other prisoners on 26 September.

=== Second Sino-Japanese War ===
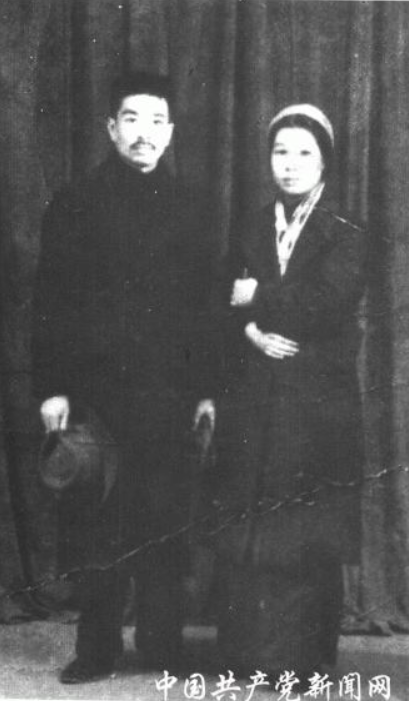
Tao with his wife, Zeng Zhi, in Hankou in 1938

After his release, Tao was sent to Hubei as a member of the standing committee of the CCP's Hubei provincial committee and head of its propaganda department. After the Battle of Wuhan in October 1938, he organised guerrilla forces in central Hubei and established the Ezhong guerrilla base in the Dahong Mountains, from which his forces carried out a night raid on the Japanese-held county seat of Yunmeng. He then joined forces with the Hubei–Henan Advance Detachment of the New Fourth Army, organised by Li Xiannian, and became its political commissar. In 1940, Tao went to Yan'an, where he later served as secretary-general of the Central Military Commission and of the General Political Department, and from 1943 also as head of the General Political Department's propaganda department. During the Yan'an Rectification Movement, like many cadres who had spent time in Nationalist prisons, he was suspected of being a spy and placed under investigation.

In 1945, Tao attended the Seventh Party Congress, which decided to launch guerrilla warfare in the Hunan–Guangdong–Guangxi border region. He was appointed deputy secretary of the party organisation there and deputy political commissar of the southbound Third Detachment of the Eighth Route Army.

=== Chinese Civil War ===
After the surrender of Japan in August 1945, Tao was ordered to northeast China instead, travelling through the Taihang Mountains and central and eastern Hebei to Shanhaiguan and reaching Shenyang in mid-September. He became secretary of the CCP's Liaoxi provincial committee and took part in the Siping Campaign, in which he was responsible for logistics, including the supply of ammunition and the evacuation of the wounded. In September 1947, he also became political commissar of the 7th Column of the Northeast Democratic United Army. After the Liaoshen Campaign, he became secretary of the CCP's Shenyang committee and deputy director of the Shenyang Military Control Commission.

In January 1949, Tao left Shenyang with the Northeast Field Army, becoming deputy director of its political department, and took part in the Pingjin Campaign. On 21 January, as plenipotentiary representative of the PLA's Pingjin front headquarters, he entered Beiping to negotiate with Fu Zuoyi. The next day, the two sides announced an agreement on the peaceful settlement of the Beiping question, under which the Nationalist troops in the city surrendered and were reorganised, sparing it from fighting. In May 1949, Tao became a member of the CCP's Central China Bureau and deputy director of the political department of the Fourth Field Army and the Central China Military Region, responsible for the takeover of the three cities of Wuhan.

== Career in the People's Republic ==
=== Central-South region and Guangxi ===
After the founding of the People's Republic, Tao was director of the political department of the Fourth Field Army and the Central-South Military Region, a member of the standing committee of the CCP's Central-South Bureau and a member of the Central-South Military and Administrative Committee. The country was then divided into six greater administrative regions. The Central-South region, comprising Henan, Hubei, Hunan, Jiangxi, Guangdong and Guangxi, was led by Lin Biao from Wuhan, while Guangdong, Guangxi, Hong Kong and Macau came under the bureau's South China Sub-bureau in Guangzhou, headed by Ye Jianying, with Zhang Yunyi in charge of Guangxi and Fang Fang assisting Ye in Guangdong.

In 1950, the suppression of bandits in Guangxi was led by Zhang Yunyi, the province's party secretary, governor and military commander. In early September, Li Tianyou and Qiu Huizuo, the commander and political commissar of the 45th Army, reported the serious situation to the Central-South Bureau and asked it to send a senior official, and the bureau sent Tao. According to his aide Yao Lijun, Tao asked Mao Zedong by telephone whether the assignment was long-term or short-term, and Mao replied that it was short-term. In November 1950, Mao sent telegrams sharply criticising the Guangxi leadership's record on bandit suppression. At a meeting of senior Guangxi cadres in Nanning at the end of November, attended by Ye and Tao, Zhang made a self-criticism, and the meeting turned into a criticism of his leadership, in which Tao and others accused him of excessive leniency and "right deviation". Mo Wenhua, then a deputy party secretary of Guangxi, later wrote in his memoirs that a leader from the Central-South Military Region's political department had dismissed the province's achievements and reported his views directly to Mao without consulting the provincial leadership. On 16 January 1951, Zhang asked for sick leave, and on Mao's proposal, the Central Committee decided on 5 February that Tao would act as first secretary of the Guangxi provincial committee during his absence. On 1 May 1951, the Guangxi Military Region reported that bandit suppression in the province had been essentially completed.

=== Guangdong and the campaigns against localism ===
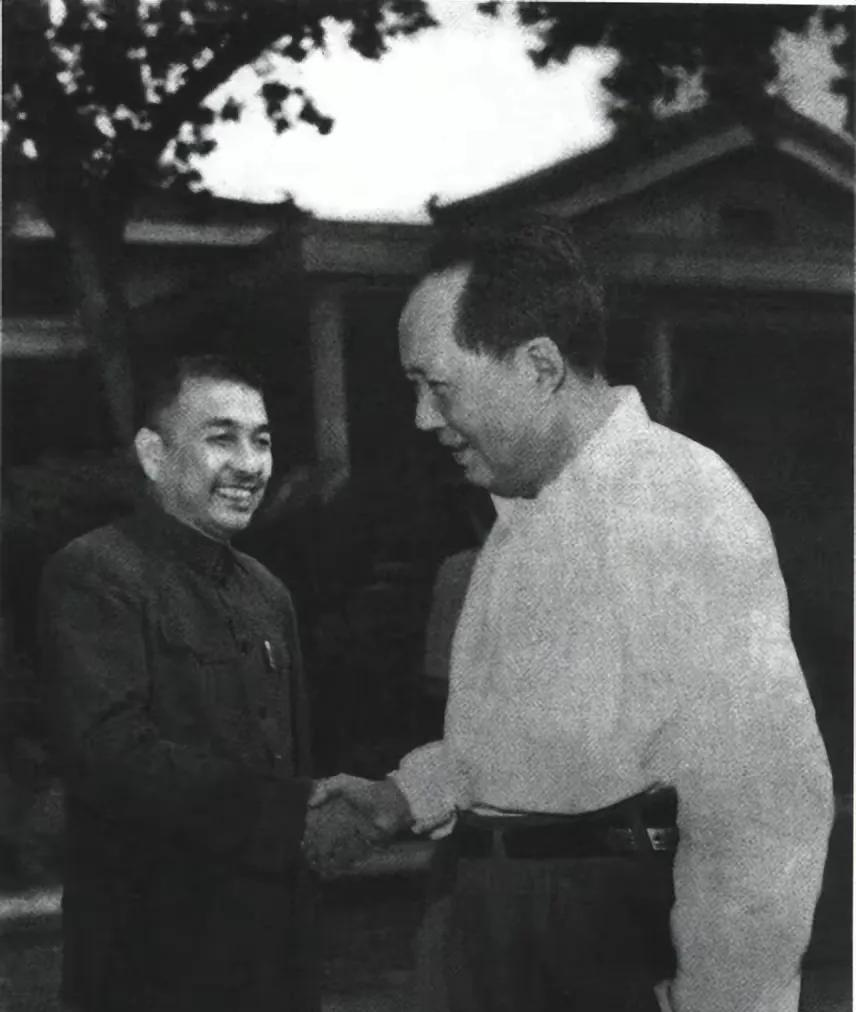
Tao with Mao Zedong

In December 1951, Tao was transferred to Guangzhou as a secretary of the South China Sub-bureau, taking over responsibility for land reform in Guangdong from Fang Fang, and as political commissar of the South China Military Region. The Central-South Bureau and its land reform committee, headed by Li Xuefeng, had long criticised land reform in Guangdong as a "peaceful land reform" that failed to mobilise the masses, and the bureau had sent Zhao Ziyang to the sub-bureau in April 1951. Under the slogan of opposing "localism" in an "impure" Guangdong party organisation, the province's land reform teams were repeatedly purged, the leadership relied on cadres who had come south with the army, and by May 1952, 6,515 local cadres had been disciplined. At a meeting of the Secretariat chaired by Mao in Beijing on 12 June 1952, Mao criticised Fang Fang for "right deviation" in land reform and "localism" in cadre policy and demoted him, and placed Tao in charge of party affairs in the sub-bureau. After an enlarged meeting of the sub-bureau in June and July 1952, more than 7,000 local cadres were disciplined or implicated, in what became known as Guangdong's first campaign against localism.

After Ye Jianying left for Beijing in August 1952, Tao was in effect in charge of Guangdong. In May 1953, he became acting secretary of the sub-bureau and acting chairman of the provincial government, and the sub-bureau under his leadership reported Fang Fang for "bureaucratism" and "decentralism", after which Fang was removed from his posts. When the sub-bureau was abolished and the CCP Guangdong provincial committee established on 1 July 1955, Tao became its secretary and governor of Guangdong. He later became first secretary, and from 1955, he was also first political commissar of the Guangzhou Military Region and president of Jinan University. At the Eighth Party Congress in 1956, he was elected to the Central Committee, receiving the third-lowest number of votes, ahead only of Zeng Xisheng and Wang Ming.

From June 1957 to October 1962, Tao led a second campaign against localism in Guangdong. In December 1957, the provincial committee adopted a resolution on a "Hainan localist anti-party alliance" and the errors of Feng Baiju and Gu Dacun, who were removed from their posts on the provincial committee. More than 20,000 local cadres were disciplined or implicated, 17 members of the provincial committee were criticised, and 77 officials at the level of provincial department or prefecture were labelled localists and dismissed or demoted. Mao endorsed the campaign: at the Chengdu Conference in March 1958, interrupting Tao's report, he said that all provinces needed to oppose localism, that localists were in fact rightists, and that outside cadres should be mixed with local ones. After the Third Plenum of the Eleventh Central Committee in 1978, and following efforts by Xi Zhongxun, Yang Shangkun and others, the cases were reviewed. On 9 February 1983, the Central Committee rehabilitated Feng Baiju and Gu Dacun and revoked the 1957 resolution, and in April 1994, it revoked Fang Fang's punishment.

In September 1960, when the six regional bureaus abolished in 1954 were restored, Tao became first secretary of the Central-South Bureau while remaining first secretary in Guangdong.

=== Great Leap Forward and its aftermath ===
During the Great Leap Forward in 1958, inflated reports of grain output led higher authorities to overestimate the harvest, while actual procurement fell far short. Tao and other provincial leaders believed that the shortfall was due to peasants concealing grain, and in late 1958, he launched a campaign against the "concealment of output" in Guangdong. In Dongguan, a county reported to have achieved yields of 1,000 jin per mu, local cadres said that concealment was serious. Only Yuan Puzhi, a member of the provincial work team and the wife of the governor, Chen Yu, said that the peasants did not have that much grain, and Tao criticised her. In March and April 1959, the provincial committee concluded that the 1958 harvest had been overstated and asked the Central Committee to end the campaign and reduce procurement quotas, and the centre approved the report and circulated it nationally. At an enlarged provincial committee meeting in May 1959, Tao made a self-criticism, and he later told a mass meeting in Chao'an that he had "had a fevered brain" and made the people go hungry. He also apologised to Yuan Puzhi.

At the Lushan Conference in July 1959, Tao led the Central-South group. After Mao circulated Peng Dehuai's letter criticising the Great Leap Forward, Tao said on 22 July that the letter had "played a good role" in deepening the discussion. On 1 August, Mao named Tao and Zhou Xiaozhou as provincial leaders who sympathised with Peng's letter. Tao then changed his position, and on 5 August, he wrote to Huang Kecheng urging him to expose Peng. In the subsequent campaign against "right opportunism", Tao waited until most provinces had acted and then labelled twelve department-level cadres in Guangdong as "opportunists", in line with the quota set from above. When the Central Committee ordered a review in 1961, he had all of them rehabilitated.

At the Seven Thousand Cadres Conference in 1962, Tao argued that the view that the central and local authorities bore responsibility for the failures in a ratio of three to seven was unconvincing, that most of the responsibility lay with the centre, and that the Secretariat's self-criticism had not gone deep enough. After the Great Chinese Famine, he expanded peasants' private plots and agreed in principle to relax controls on farmers and fishermen in the border areas, which contributed to a second wave of emigration to Hong Kong in 1962. According to the journalist Yang Jisheng, when crowds trying to reach Hong Kong gathered at a Guangzhou railway station in early June 1962, Tao classified the situation at an internal meeting as a "contradiction between ourselves and the enemy", after which troops sealed off the station and more than 1,600 people were arrested.

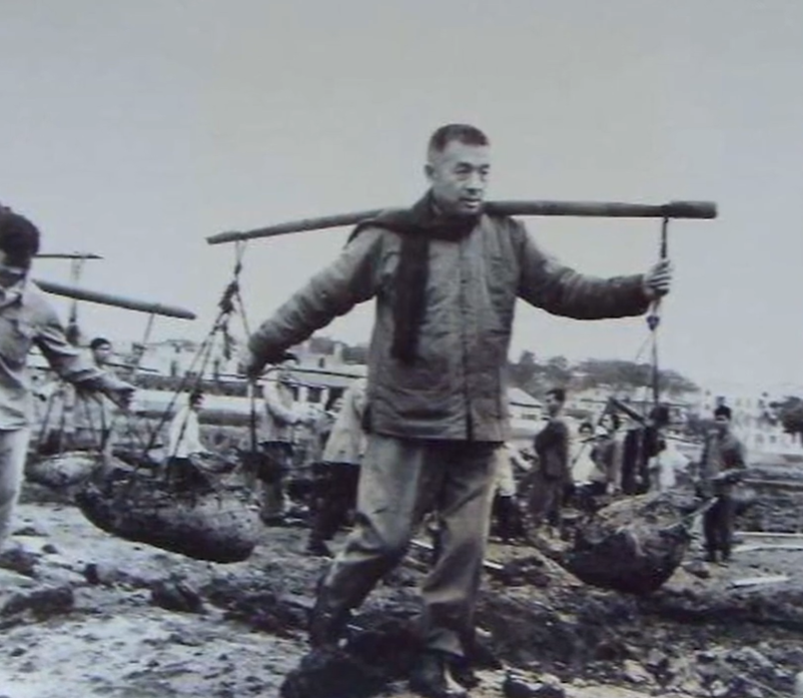
Tao working in a field in the 1950s

Tao also promoted rural models in Guangdong. In 1961 and 1962, Zhouxin commune in Qingyuan County introduced a system of production responsibility in which output quotas were assigned to households, and in 1962, after Tao and Zhao Ziyang investigated it, the provincial committee promoted the "Zhouxin experience" across the province. After visiting Longsheng County, Guangxi, with Wang Renzhong in June 1962, Tao had a report drafted recommending production responsibility systems, which Mao described as "Marxist" and had circulated to the central work conference at Beidaihe in July. Mao asked Tao and Wang to draft a decision on contracting output to households, but after the conference turned to stressing class struggle, the draft was not adopted.

=== Central leadership ===
In December 1964, the Central Committee nominated Tao, Ke Qingshi and Xie Fuzhi as new vice premiers, and in January 1965, the Third National People's Congress appointed Tao a Vice Premier, responsible for propaganda, culture and education. On 23 May 1966, the enlarged Politburo meeting that dealt with Peng Zhen, Luo Ruiqing, Lu Dingyi and Yang Shangkun appointed Tao executive secretary of the Secretariat and head of the Propaganda Department in place of Lu Dingyi. According to Zheng Rong, the appointment was proposed by Deng Xiaoping and approved by Mao. At the Eleventh Plenum of the Eighth Central Committee in August 1966, Tao was elected to the Politburo Standing Committee, ranking fourth after Mao, Lin Biao and Zhou Enlai. He also became an adviser to the Central Cultural Revolution Group (CCRG) and assisted Zhou Enlai with the work of the State Council. He oversaw the party's Organisation and Propaganda departments, the ministries of education, culture and health, the sports commission, Xinhua News Agency, the People's Daily, publishing and broadcasting, and the philosophy and social sciences division of the Chinese Academy of Sciences, and he took part in the leadership of the Central Military Commission. His promotion allowed his protégé, Zhao Ziyang, to take over as head of Guangdong.

According to Ezra Vogel, Tao and Zhao were among the most enthusiastic early supporters of the Red Guards among the party's leaders, but quickly fell from favour because they tried to control the excesses of the radical left led by Zhang Chunqiao and Jiang Qing.

=== Cultural Revolution ===
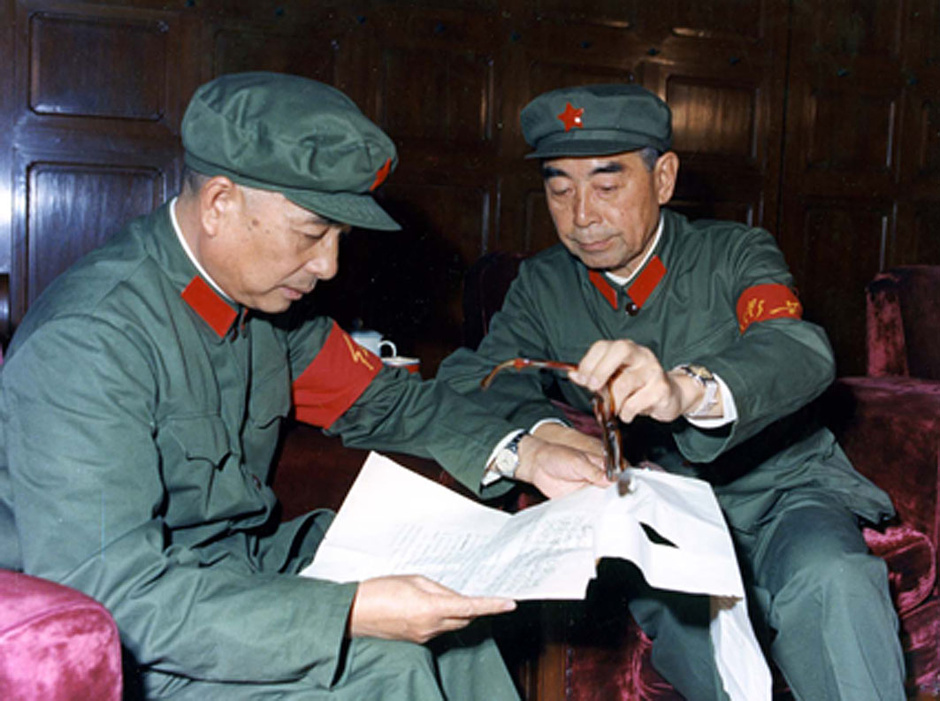
Tao with Zhou Enlai on the Tiananmen rostrum, 15 September 1966

On 9 June 1966, shortly after arriving in Beijing, Tao attended a meeting called by Mao in Hangzhou on whether to send work teams to schools and other units. Like Liu Shaoqi, Deng Xiaoping and most of those present, and unlike Chen Boda, he favoured sending them, while Mao said that they need not be sent in haste. The work teams went on to label large numbers of teachers and students as counter-revolutionaries, sharply escalating conflicts.

From June to July 1966, Liu and Deng submitted to Mao a draft notice on conducting the Cultural Revolution in industry, transport and construction, which emphasised phased implementation under party leadership and the principle of "grasp revolution, promote production", and Mao approved it on 2 July. Tao strongly supported this approach and wrote two People's Daily editorials on the theme, published on 7 September and 10 November 1966, but the CCRG accused him of "using production to suppress revolution". At an enlarged Politburo meeting, he was attacked on the same grounds by Wang Li, a junior member of the CCRG. Before the Eleventh Plenum, Tao and Wang Renzhong revised the draft decision on the Cultural Revolution that became the "Sixteen Points": they removed references to a "black line" and to dictatorship over "black gangs", stated that most cadres were good or comparatively good, and, on the advice of Ye Jianying and Liu Zhijian, exempted the army from mass campaigns. Mao approved the revision and added the line "use reasoning, not violence".

In October 1966, Mao called for criticism of the "bourgeois reactionary line". According to Wang Li, the slogan was aimed chiefly at Tao. In the coverage of that year's National Day celebrations, Tao insisted that photographs of all members of the Politburo Standing Committee appear, and when no suitable picture of Deng Xiaoping could be found, Xinhua produced one by placing Deng's head on Chen Yi's body. After the Anting crisis in November 1966, Mao endorsed Zhang Chunqiao's acceptance of the demands of Shanghai rebel workers, and Tao made a self-criticism at a meeting of the Standing Committee on 14 November. In November and December, a conference on industry and transport directed by Tao and Zhou drew up regulations favouring a gradual approach that the CCRG opposed. At enlarged Politburo meetings chaired by Lin Biao from 4 to 6 December, Tao was criticised, and Lin said that the problem lay with Tao rather than with Gu Mu. The meetings instead adopted a CCRG directive that, together with a directive on the countryside, extended the Cultural Revolution to industry and rural areas.

A poster denouncing Tao during the Cultural Revolution. The slogan reads "Down with Tao Zhu!"

In late 1966, Tao's conflict with Jiang Qing and other CCRG members intensified. When rebels in Wuhan attacked Wang Renzhong, Tao proposed that Wang resign from the CCRG and return to the Central-South Bureau. At a joint meeting of the Politburo and the CCRG chaired by Zhou Enlai, he was criticised for having sent work teams and protected "capitalist roaders", and was labelled "China's biggest royalist" and "the representative of the Liu–Deng line without Liu and Deng". At one CCRG meeting, when Jiang Qing demanded to know how he had learned that she had destroyed certain materials concerning Lin Biao, Tao replied, "You interfere too much. You meddle in too many things." On the night of 30 December, he was confronted for more than six hours by rebels from Wuhan at the gate of Zhongnanhai. In the account of Frederick Teiwes and Warren Sun, Mao at first protected Tao and criticised Jiang Qing, but Tao's defence of treating the cases of Liu and Deng as "contradictions among the people" displeased Mao, and despite Zhou Enlai's and Lin Biao's advice to adopt a more passive attitude, the CCRG's attacks continued.

On 4 January 1967, Jiang Qing, Chen Boda and Kang Sheng told a delegation of Wuhan rebels that Tao was "the new representative of the bourgeois reactionary line at the centre" and "China's biggest royalist". That evening, posters and leaflets calling for his overthrow appeared in Beijing, and he was placed under house arrest in Zhongnanhai. Zhou Enlai said on 7 January that Tao was a member of the Standing Committee, which had not discussed his case, and on 23 January, in the presence of Jiang Qing and Chen Boda, that he had no grounds to distrust him. Radical leaders labelled Tao "the proxy leader of the Liu-and-Deng roaders" and a "Khrushchev-style careerist". A big-character poster by a Zhejiang secondary school student attacking two of Tao's books interpreted a passage in his writings, which likened revolutionaries to rocks "pointing to the blue sky, facing the sea", as evidence of longing for Taiwan and the Kuomintang's "blue sky and white sun".

Throughout 1967 and 1968, Tao was repeatedly taken out of Zhongnanhai for struggle sessions. In August 1968, during a mass rally in Tiananmen Square against Liu Shaoqi, Deng Xiaoping and Tao, separate denunciation meetings were held in Zhongnanhai for each of them and their wives. According to Zeng Zhi's memoir, Tao was beaten during the meeting, and afterwards, his access to documents was cut off and he was kept under guard.

=== Illness and death ===
Tao began to suffer from dizziness and nausea in late 1968. In March 1969, he was admitted to the PLA No. 302 Hospital and diagnosed with gallbladder cancer. According to some accounts, he was at first denied treatment. On Zhou Enlai's instructions, he was transferred to the PLA No. 301 Hospital and treated by a team of specialists from Beijing and Shanghai, but his condition worsened after surgery, and by late September, the cancer had spread. In October 1969, as part of the evacuation of senior cadres from Beijing ordered amid the Sino-Soviet border conflict, he was sent alone to Hefei, Anhui. A further operation was approved on 15 November, but the cancer had spread too widely to operate, and Tao died in Hefei on 30 November 1969, at the age of 61. His family was not permitted to visit him during his final illness or after his death.

=== Rehabilitation ===
In December 1978, the third plenary session of the Eleventh Central Committee reviewed and reversed the verdict on Tao. On 24 December 1978, a memorial meeting for Tao was held in Beijing, at which Chen Yun, vice-chairman of the Central Committee, delivered the eulogy.

== Personal life ==
In 1932, while in Fujian, Tao married Zeng Zhi (1911–1998), who after 1949 served as party secretary of Guangzhou and deputy head of the CCP Organization Department. The couple had a daughter, Tao Siliang, who was born in 1941 in Yan'an. She became a politician in the late 1980s and led several initiatives in public health and the import of Western medical technology.

== Memorial ==
Tao's former residence at his birthplace in Qiyang is now a memorial hall. It is a major historical and cultural site protected at the national level and a red tourism site in Hunan.

== Works ==
- Ideals, Integrity and Spiritual Life (China Youth Publishing House, 1962)
- Thought, Feeling and Literary Talent (Guangdong People's Publishing House, 1964)
- Collected Works of Tao Zhu (People's Publishing House, 1979)
- Selected Poems of Tao Zhu (People's Literature Publishing House, 1979)
- Selected Poems of Tao Zhu, Annotated (Guangdong People's Publishing House, 1980)

Military offices
Preceded by Tan Zheng	Political Commissar of the PLA Guangdong Military District; 1952–1954	Succeeded by Song Weishi
Government offices
Preceded by Ye Jianying	Governor of Guangdong; 1953–1957	Succeeded by Chen Yu
Assembly seats
New title	Chairman of the Guangdong Provincial Committee of the Chinese People's Political Consultative Conference; 1955–1960	Succeeded by Ou Mengjue
Party political offices
Preceded by Ye Jianying	First Secretary of the Guangdong Provincial Committee of the Chinese Communist Party; 1955–1965	Succeeded by Zhao Ziyang
Preceded by Lu Dingyi	Head of the Publicity Department of the Chinese Communist Party; 1966–1967	Succeeded by Geng Biao
Educational offices
Preceded by Li Shouyong; Abolished since 1949	President of the Jinan University; 1958–1963	Succeeded by Chen Xujing
