= Lu Min =

Lu Min is the name of:

- Lu Min (aviator) (1926–2000), Chinese flying ace during the Korean War
- Lu Min (actor) (born 1970), Burmese film actor and director
- Lu Min (writer) (born 1973), Chinese writer

== See also ==
- Min Lu (1954–2013), Burmese writer
