= Lu Min (aviator) =

Chinese flying ace (1926–2000)

- 鲁珉
- Born: 12 November 1926; Longkou, Shandong, Republic of China
- Died: 21 December 2000 (aged 74); Beijing, China
- Military career
- Allegiance: China
- Branch: People's Liberation Army Air Force
- Service years: 1944–1971
- Rank: Colonel
- Commands: 12th Fighter Aviation Division
- Conflicts: Korean War

Lu Min (Chinese: 鲁珉; November 12, 1926 – December 21, 2000) was a pilot in the People's Liberation Army Air Force and was a flying ace during the Korean War, with eight victories. He was later purged due to alleged connections with Marshal Lin Biao's coup attempt against Mao Zedong. Although all Chinese aces have received the title Combat Hero in acknowledgement of their services, very little information is known of the Chinese pilots during the war due to the lack of published records.

== Early life ==
Born on 12 November 1926 in Zouliu Village, Longgang Subdistrict (then Longkou Town), Longkou, Shandong, Lu Min was born into a seafaring family. He attended primary school in Longkou from 1934 to 1940 and between 1940 and 1942, he worked as a child laborer at the Ivanov Automobile Repair Factory in Heihe, Heilongjiang, then part of the Japanese puppet state of Manchukuo. He returned to Longkou in 1942 to continue his secondary education.

On 9 February 1944, Lu left the Japanese-occupied territories for Santaji Town in Fuyang, Anhui, after he was unwilling to receive education under Japanese rule. Through arrangements made by the Shandong Provincial Government of the Republic of China, he enrolled at Shandong Temporary Middle School, but returned to Longkou on 20 March after concluding that the school was characterized by corruption and disorder. In April 1944, Lu attended Children's Day activities in the Communist-controlled area of Longkou, where he first came into contact with the Chinese Communist Party and the Eighth Route Army. The following month, he enrolled at Beihai United Middle School in the same area and graduated in October 1944.

== Military career ==
From October 1944 to September 1945, Lu served as director of studies at a primary school as the Chinese Communist Party expanded its educational system in guerrilla-controlled areas. In September 1945, he enrolled at Shandong University. Lu joined the Chinese Communist Party in August 1946 and was subsequently transferred to Northeast China. Assigned by the Organization Department of the CCP Northeast Bureau, he entered the former Mudanjiang Aviation School, the first aviator training school of the CCP, for flight training and enlisted in the People's Liberation Army in November 1946. From November 1946 to February 1948, he completed the school's second mechanical engineering training program. In July 1947, while still a flight trainee, he was appointed a mechanical engineering instructor in the school's Training Department. Following his graduation from flight training in February 1948, he continued serving as an flight instructor before being appointed education officer in the Department of Mechanical Education at the aviation school. In September 1949, he was transferred to the Mechanical Training Brigade at an airbase in Jianqiao Town in Hangzhou, where he successively served as director of the practical training laboratory, instructor, company commander and political instructor.

=== Korean War ===
In March 1952, Lu participated in the Korean War as a member of the Volunteer Air Force of the People's Volunteer Army and in July of that year, he was appointed Chief Technical Inspector of the 12th Fighter Aviation Division. In December 1952, while serving as a squadron commander, Lu was credited in shooting down eight United States F-86 Sabre fighter aircraft in aerial combat, while flying the MiG-15. For these achievements, he was awarded the honorary titles of Special-Class People's Merit Hero, "Expert in Shooting Down Sabre Aircraft", and First-Class Combat Hero. The government of North Korea also awarded him the Order of Freedom and Independence, Second Class.

=== Post war ===
In December 1953, Lu became deputy commander of the 36th Regiment of the 12th Air Division, serving as acting regimental commander while the commander's position was vacant. In March 1955, he was appointed acting commander and later commander of the 34th Regiment of the same division.

On 23 June 1956, while commanding the 34th Regiment, Lu shot down a Republic of China Air Force B-17G reconnaissance aircraft piloted by Yeh Cheng-min, while flying a MiG-17. The B-17G had flown from Taiwan into mainland China and was dropping propaganda leaflets over Zhejiang, Anhui and Jiangxi provinces when it was shot down at night over Guangfeng, Jiangxi, killing all 11 crew members on board. The engagement marked the first recorded nighttime aerial interception resulting in the shootdown of an enemy aircraft by PLAAF fighter aviation during the air defense of the People's Republic of China. For his actions, he received commendation from the Ministry of National Defense of China.

In February 1959, Lu was appointed deputy commander of the 12th Air Division. In March 1962, he became deputy director and Party secretary of the Training Department of the Air Force of the Nanjing Military Region. In the winter of 1968, he was appointed Party secretary of the headquarters of the Nanjing Military Region Air Force. In 1969, he became Director of the Operations Department of the PLA Air Force Headquarters, while Lin Liguo, son of Defense Minister Lin Biao, concurrently served as deputy director of the department.

=== Lin Biao incident ===
On the evening of 11 September 1971, Lu was summoned to a building at Beijing Xijiao Airport, where Lin Liguo, Zhou Yuchi and Jiang Tengjiao allegedly briefed him on a conspiracy to assassinate Mao Zedong. According to later accounts, Lu was shown a handwritten order bearing the words: "Carry out the orders conveyed by Comrades Liguo and Yuchi. Lin Biao, 8 September." Following the Lin Biao incident on 13 September 1971, Lu was among a group of individuals associated with the alleged "Project 571" plot who were placed under isolation and investigation before 18 September.

According to later memoirs by Li Desheng, on the afternoon of 14 September 1971, shortly after Chinese authorities received reports that a Chinese civil aviation Trident aircraft carrying Lin Biao had crashed near Öndörkhaan in Mongolia, Lu sought out Li to confess his involvement in the conspiracy. Li recalled that Lu, with bloodshot eyes and in tears, admitted that he had participated in a plot to assassinate Mao but stated that on the night of 11 September his wife had deliberately reddened his eyes with salt water so that he could be admitted to the PLA Air Force General Hospital under the pretext of an emergency illness, thereby avoiding further participation in the plan. After reviewing Lu's written statement, Premier of China Zhou Enlai reportedly remarked that his testimony was of great importance. Li subsequently placed Lu under detention at the Asian-African Students' Sanatorium in Beijing's Western Hills but allowed him relatively free movement, later relocating Lu's family there for what he described as their protection. Mao Zedong later reportedly commented: "In Lin Biao's coup attempt, some wanted to act but dared not; others were ordered to act but were unwilling. Lu Min was one who was ordered to act but was unwilling."

During the prosecution of the Lin Biao and Jiang Qing counterrevolutionary groups, the Indictment of the Special Procuratorial Office of the Supreme People's Procuratorate, issued on 2 November 1980, alleged that between 8 and 11 September 1971, Lin Liguo and Zhou Yuchi conveyed written orders for an armed coup to several senior Air Force officers, including Lu, then Director of the Operations Department of the Air Force Headquarters. The indictment alleged that the conspirators planned to assassinate Mao through various means, including attacking his train with flamethrowers and rocket launchers, destroying railway bridges with explosives, bombing the train from aircraft, or attacking him during an official reception. On 9 May 1980, the Military Court of the PLA Air Force convicted Lu of actively participating in a counterrevolutionary group, conspiring to overthrow the government and attempting to split the state. He was sentenced to ten years' imprisonment and deprived of political rights for two years, with his sentence calculated from the date of his detention.

== Later life ==
After serving a period of time in prison, he was released on medical parole due to illness. After his release, Lu settled in Luoyang where his daughter lived. He returned to Beijing soon after where he died of illness in 21 December 2000 at the age of 74.

== See also ==
- List of Korean War flying aces
