= Yeh Cheng-min =

Taiwanese military pilot (1921–1956)

- 葉拯民
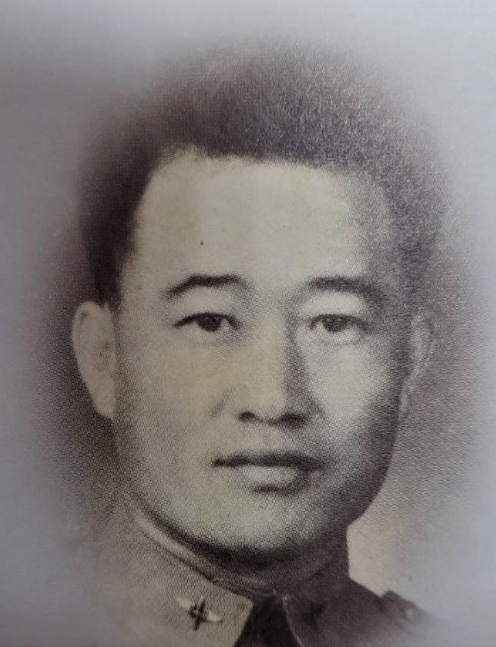
- Born: 23 December 1921; Liaoyang, Fengtian, Republic of China
- Died: 23 June 1956 (aged 34) over Guangfeng, Jiangxi, China
- Military career
- Allegiance: Taiwan
- Branch: Republic of China Air Force
- Service years: late 1930s–1956
- Rank: Colonel
- Unit: Air Force Special Mission Group
- Conflicts: Second Sino-Japanese War; Cross-strait conflict †

Yeh Cheng-min (simplified Chinese: 叶拯民; traditional Chinese: 葉拯民; pinyin: Yè Zhěngmín; Wade–Giles: Yeh Cheng-min; 23 December 1921 – 23 June 1956) was an officer and military aviator of the Republic of China Air Force. He served as commander of a special operations crew in the predecessor of the Black Bat Squadron. During a clandestine mission over mainland China in June 1956, the aircraft he commanded was intercepted and shot down by the People's Liberation Army Air Force.

== Early life ==
Yeh was born in Liaoyang County, Fengtian Province (now Liaoyang city in Liaoning) on 23 December 1921. Following the Mukden Incident in 1931, he enrolled in the 17th class of the Central Military Academy, majoring in military logistics, before transferring to the 15th class of the Republic of China Air Force Academy in Kunming, from where he graduated in the bomber pilot training.

== Military career ==
During the Second Sino-Japanese War and the subsequent Chinese Civil War, he flew approximately 80 operational missions. Following the Chinese communist victory in mainland China, he along with other ROCAF personnel withdrew to Taiwan. In 1951, while serving as a captain and staff officer with the 8th Air Group, Yeh was accused of harbouring communist agents. He was tried by the Ministry of National Defense but was acquitted due to insufficient evidence. Recognized for his flying ability and composure under pressure, Yeh was selected to join the Special Mission Group (SMG) of the Intelligence Directorate of Air Force Headquarters, the covert unit later known as the Black Bat Squadron (Air Force 34th Squadron), where he served as a pilot flying reconnaissance missions over mainland China.

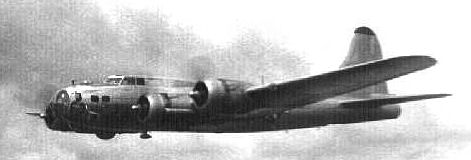
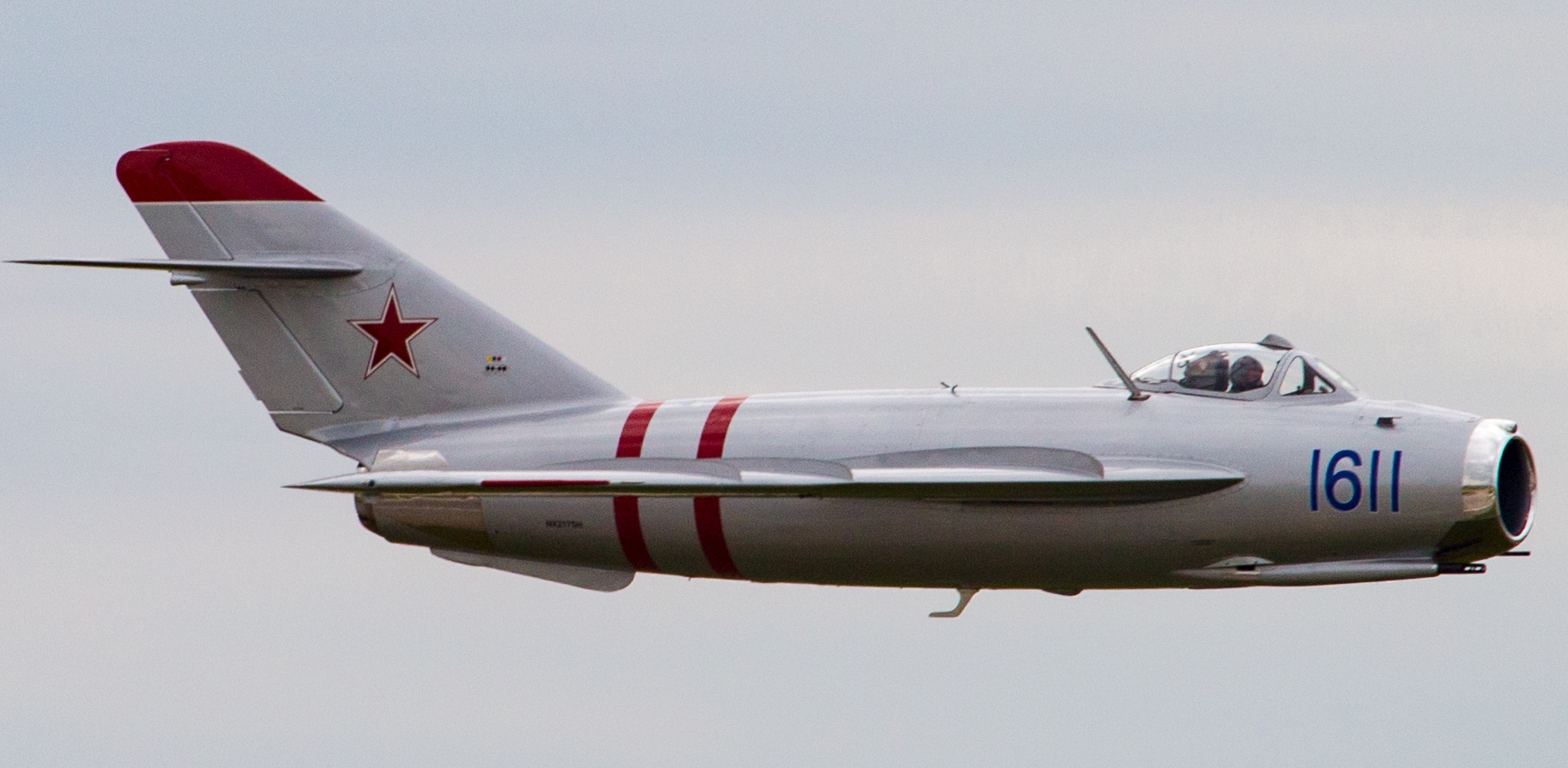
The RB-17G (left), similarly to the one flown by Yeh on his final mission, was shot down by MiG-17 (right).

On the night of 22 June 1956, a Republic of China Air Force B-17G Flying Fortress reconnaissance aircraft, flown by Yeh and consisting of 11 crew members, departed Hsinchu Air Base at approximately 21:20, flying at an altitude below 1,000 metres on a covert mission over mainland China. At approximately 22:20, the aircraft crossed the coast near Yuhuan in Zhejiang, before proceeding over parts of Zhejiang, Anhui and Jiangxi provinces, where it dropped leaflets while maintaining radio contact with base in Taiwan. Beginning at approximately 23:04, the aircraft was detected and tracked by the Fifth Air Corps of the People's Liberation Army Air Force, which initiated an interception operation. The duty pilot that night was Lu Min, commander of the 34th Regiment, 12th Air Division in Quzhou, Zhejiang. After receiving an alert placing the unit on its highest state of readiness, Lu took off in his MiG-17 fighter. Guided by ground-controlled interception, Lu spotted the B-17 at an altitude of approximately 2,000 metres (6,600 ft) from about 9 kilometres (5.6 mi) away. After reporting the sighting, he closed on the bomber and initiated his attack over Guangfeng, Jiangxi. Lu opened fire at a range of approximately 600 metres (2,000 ft) but did not immediately disable the aircraft. After repositioning, he made a second attack from a distance of approximately 270 metres (890 ft), firing for approximately two seconds. The B-17 caught fire and crashed in Guangfeng, killing all eleven crew members including Yeh. The incident marked the People's Liberation Army Air Force's first successful nighttime aerial shootdown. The following morning, personnel from the 12th Air Division recovered the wreckage and the remains of the crew.

Yeh was posthumously promoted to the rank of colonel in recognition of his service. Following his death, Lu Ch'ien-yüan was appointed acting commander of the Special Mission Group (SMG).

=== Crew of the RB-17G ===
- Yeh Cheng-min (葉拯民) - Aircraft commander and pilot
- Yang Sung-wen (楊頌文) - Co-pilot
- Lin Ch'i-jung (林其榕) - Electronic countermeasures officer
- Lo P'u (羅樸) - Electronic countermeasures officer
- Chou Hsing-kuo (周興國) - Navigator
- Ch'ien Tuan-hsin (錢端信) - Navigator
- Tu Han-p'ing (杜漢萍) - Communications officer
- Kao P'eng-fei (高鵬飛) - Flight engineer
- Ch'en Li-jen (陳立仁) - Air-drop operator
- Hao Shu-ch'in (郝書勤) - Air-drop operator
- Wang Mao-sen (王茂森) - Air-drop operator

== Honors ==
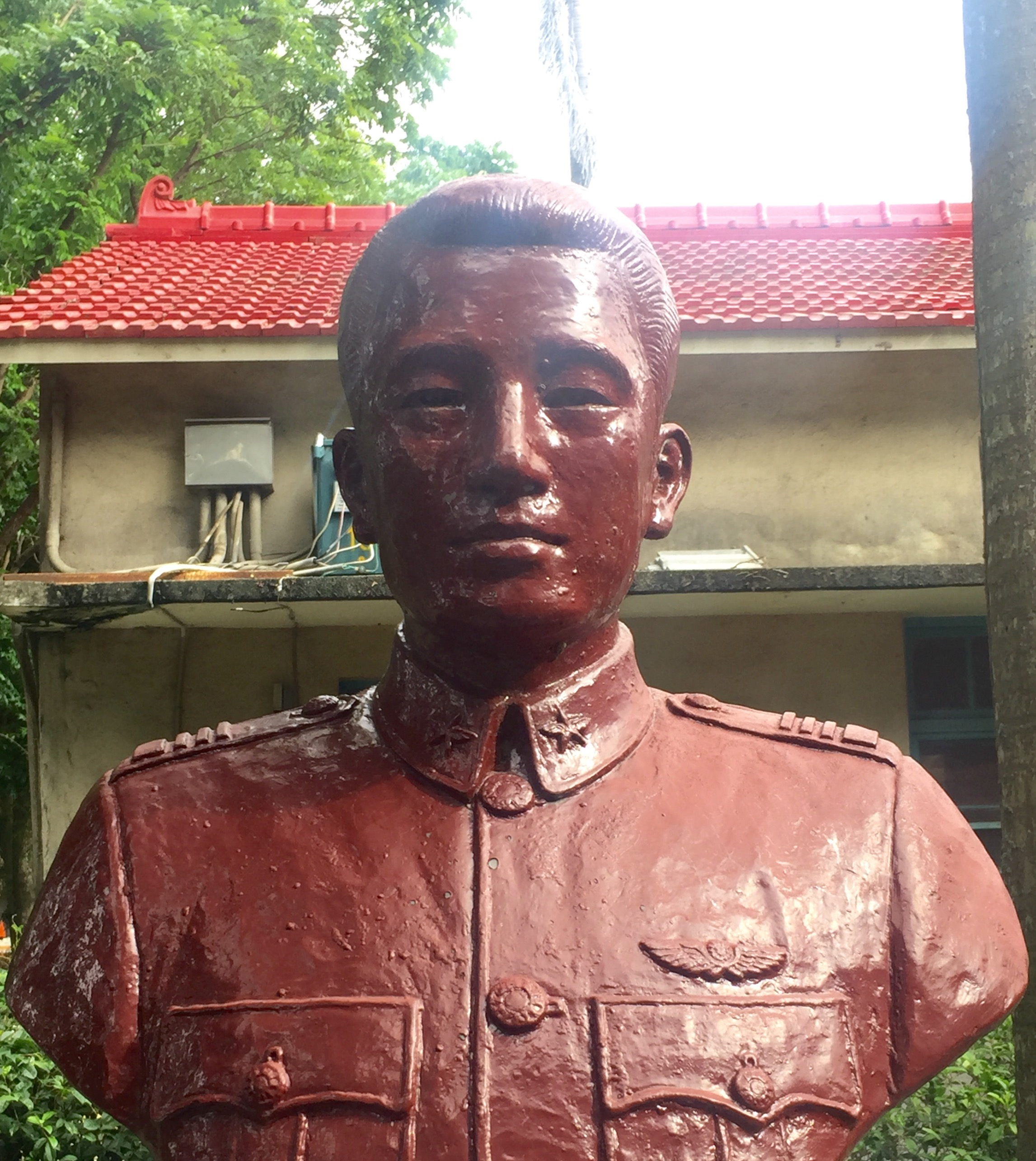
Statue of Yeh in Yunlin County

For his military service, Yeh earned many decorations including the Medal of Achievement, Exemplar Medal and China War Memorial Medal.

Cheng-min Elementary School in Huwei Township in Yunlin County was named in Yeh's honour. A bronze bust commemorating Yeh was erected on the campus. The school also established the "Black Bat Historical Corridor" (黑蝙蝠光陰迴廊), an exhibition introducing students to the history of the squadron.

In August 2012, Yeh's family applied for compensation for his 1951 pre-trial detention. In February 2013, the Compensation Foundation for Wrongful Trials on Charges of Sedition and Espionage during the Martial Law Period approved the application, finding that his detention before his acquittal qualified for compensation under the relevant legislation.
