= Dashi Township =

Dashi Township may refer to the following locations in the People's Republic of China:

- Dashi Township, Hunan (大市乡), in Leiyang
- Dashi Township, Zhejiang (跶石乡), in Longquan

Written as "大石乡":

- Dashi Township, Anhui, in Taihu County
- Dashi Township, Chongqing, in Dianjiang County
- Dashi Township, Gansu, in Gangu County
- Dashi Township, Jiangxi, in Guangfeng County
- Dashi Township, Xuyong County, in Xuyong County, Sichuan
- Dashi Township, Yuechi County, in Yuechi County, Sichuan
