= Tao Siliang =

Chinese politician (born 1941)

- 陶斯亮
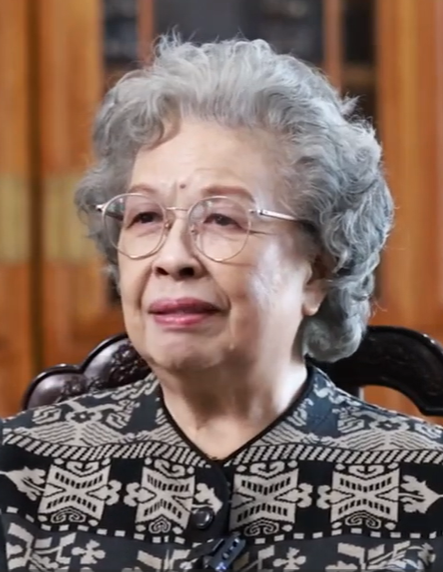
- Tao in 2021

Member of the Tenth and Eleventh National Committees of the Chinese People's Political Consultative Conference
- In office 2003–2013

Personal details
- Born: April 1941 (age 85) Yan'an Soviet, Shaanxi, Republic of China
- Party: Chinese Communist Party
- Spouse: Li You
- Children: 2 (son and daughter)
- Parent(s): Tao Zhu (father); Zeng Zhi (mother)
- Education: People's Liberation Army Second Military Medical University
- Occupation: Physician, politician, philanthropist

Tao Siliang (Note: Chinese: 陶斯亮; pinyin: Táo Sīliàng) (born April 1941) is a Chinese physician, politician and philanthropist. After a medical career in the People's Liberation Army hospital system, she worked in central government and later became a leading figure in civic and medical philanthropy.

== Early life and education ==
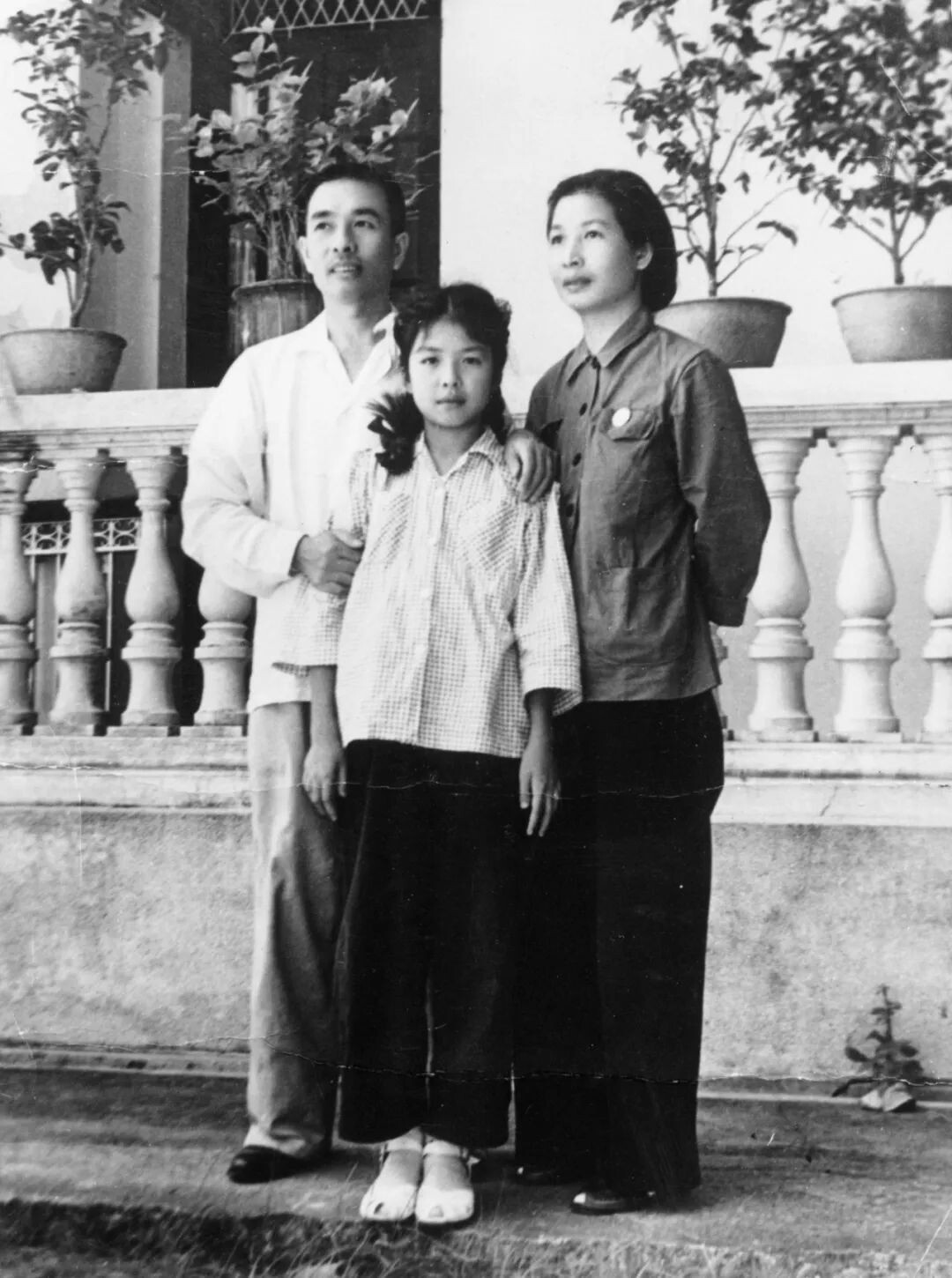
Tao with her parents, 1954

Tao Siliang was born in April 1941 in Yan'an, Shaanxi, the wartime base of the Chinese Communist Party. Her ancestral home is Qiyang, Hunan. She is the daughter of Tao Zhu, a senior revolutionary leader of the Chinese Communist Party, and Zeng Zhi, a prominent organizational leader within the Party. In 1945, when her parents were ordered to move south to open new anti-Japanese guerrilla base areas, the four-year-old Tao was left at the Yan'an Nursery and entrusted to the care of veteran Red Army soldier Yang Shunqing. During her childhood and adolescence, she lived and studied in Guangzhou, where her parents worked in political roles.

In 1961, Tao entered the People's Liberation Army Second Military Medical University in Shanghai. She joined the Chinese Communist Party in 1965 and graduated in 1967 with a bachelor's degree in medicine. During this time, her father was persecuted during the Cultural Revolution, resulting in his death in 1969. Beginning in 1968, she worked as a physician in several military hospitals, including the PLA No. 7 Hospital, the PLA No. 26 Hospital and the Air Force General Hospital. She practiced medicine for nearly two decades and attained the professional rank of attending physician.

In December 1978, the People's Daily published Tao's essay "A Letter Finally Sent – To My Father Tao Zhu" (Chinese: 一封终于发出的信——给我的爸爸陶铸) in two consecutive issues on 10 and 11 December. Written in the form of a personal letter to her deceased father, the article recounted his removal from office, detention, enforced family separation and her inability to be present during his final illness. The essay combined personal grief with an account of political persecution and portrayed Tao Zhu as a committed communist who endured injustice while maintaining conviction. The publication produced a strong public response. Within one month, the People's Daily editorial office received more than 1,000 letters and submissions, and the article was widely read and discussed. In 1980, the essay received the China Outstanding Reportage Literature Award and became one of the notable works of early post–Cultural Revolution reportage literature.

== Political and philanthropy career ==
In 1987, Tao was transferred to the United Front Work Department of the Central Committee of the Chinese Communist Party, where she worked as deputy director of the Sixth Bureau. In 1991, she left her position in government and entered the civic and non-profit sector.

After 1991, she joined the China Mayors Association, where she worked successively as deputy secretary-general and secretary-general, and later as vice president and executive vice president. At the same time, she was vice president and later president of the China Medical Foundation. In the early 1990s, she promoted nationwide programs for the prevention of iodine deficiency disorders through the popularization of iodized salt. Her advocacy contributed to the convening in 1993 of the "China 2000 Mobilization Conference on Eliminating Iodine Deficiency Disorders" and to the promulgation by the State Council of China on the 'Regulation on the Administration of Eliminating the Harm of Iodine Deficiency through Salt Iodization.'

From 2001, she was vice president and secretary-general of the China Mayors Association and as vice chairperson of the China Medical Foundation. She was also editor-in-chief of China Mayor, the official journal of the association, and as vice chairperson of the China Urban Development Report Council. In 2012, Tao began cooperation with the Starkey Hearing Foundation in the United States on the Chinese implementation of the program 'So the World May Hear', through which hearing aids were donated to impoverished Chinese people with hearing impairments. In 2016, she founded the Beijing Aier Public Welfare Foundation and became its founding chairperson. The foundation focuses on charity advocacy, poverty relief, assistance to people with disabilities, educational support, public health and emergency relief. She currently serves as advisor to the China Mayors Association, honorary president of its women's mayor branch and founding chairperson of the Beijing Aier Public Welfare Foundation. She supported the anti-corruption campaign under Xi Jinping, stating:

Through revolution and the heritage of blood our parents bequeathed to us the Red Gene. I don't believe that this gene will ever lose its lustre, because we will carry it forward. I'm willing to admit that I'm a Red Second Generation because that's just what I am, [a member of] the second generation of revolutionaries. It is time for us to play our natural, positive role and support General Secretary Xi Jinping in carrying out the anti-corruption campaign pursuing reform to the end.

Tao was a specially invited member of the 10th National Committee of the Chinese People's Political Consultative Conference (CPPCC) from 2003 to 2008 and later was as a member of the 11th National Committee of the CPPCC from 2008 to 2013.

On the afternoon of 5 November 2022, amid the COVID-19 pandemic in China, Tao accompanied her husband by high-speed rail from Beijing to Huzhou to attend an event. To ensure a smooth return to Beijing, the couple underwent nucleic acid testing almost daily, but before returning, Tao discovered a pop-up alert on her Beijing Health Kit health code which prevented her entry into the city, while her husband's code remained unaffected. Over two days, she submitted multiple appeals and contacted public service hotlines without resolution. Tao publicly criticized the big-data contact tracing system as unprofessional and overly crude, questioning whether the Beijing Health Kit complied with the national policy of "precision epidemic prevention."

== Honors ==
Tao has received wide recognition for her contributions to public welfare. In 2015 she received a nomination award at the Ninth China Charity Award. In 2018 she was named "Public Welfare Figure of the Year" by China Newsweek. In 2019 she was selected among "70 People of 70 Years of Chinese Charity Brands." In 2020 she was named "Person of the Year" by China Philanthropist magazine.

== Personal life ==
Tao is married to writer Li You, with whom she has two children (son and daughter).
