= 12th Fighter Aviation Division =

Air division of Chinese PLA-AF

The 12th Fighter Aviation Division (第12歼击机师) was an air division of the Chinese People's Liberation Army Air Force (PLA-AF). It was established in 1950, and disestablished by 2016-18.

PLA-AF fighter divisions generally consisted of about 17,000 personnel and 70-120 aircraft. Among its notable members was Lu Min.

It was part of the Jinan PLAAF Base, and joined the Northern Theatre Command, but by 2016-18, it had been broken up into three new brigades:

- 34th Brigade (Gongzhuling, Jilin), Chengdu J-10A, J-10SY;
- 35th Brigade (Qihe, Shandong), Shenyang J-8Bs and JJ-7A;
- 36th Brigade (Gaomi, Shandong), J-10A, J-10SY;

A typical single-seat air brigade holds 32-34 aircraft, in three battalion leader-grade flight groups (each of 8 aircraft), six spare aircraft, and a company leader-grade flight squadron of 2-4 training aircraft.
