= Zeng Zhi =

Chinese communist revolutionary and politician (1911–1998)

- 曾志
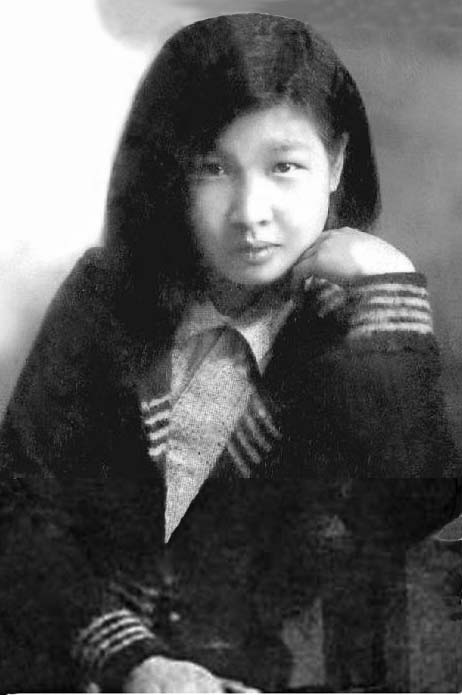

Deputy Head of the Organization Department of the CCP Central Committee
- In office December 1977 – 1982

Secretary of the CCP Guangzhou Municipal Committee
- In office 1955–1966

Personal details
- Born: Zeng Zhaoxue; 4 April 1911 Yizhang County, Hunan, Qing China
- Died: 21 June 1998 (aged 87) Beijing, China
- Party: Chinese Communist Party (from 1926)
- Spouses: Xia Mingzhen (m. 1927; died 1928) Cai Xiemin (m. 1928; sep. 1932) Tao Zhu (m. 1932; died 1969)
- Children: 4, including Tao Siliang
- Education: Hengyang Peasant Movement Training Institute; Yan'an Marxist–Leninist Academy

Zeng Zhi (Chinese: 曾志, 4 April 1911 – 21 June 1998), born Zeng Zhaoxue, was a Chinese communist revolutionary and politician. She took part in the Southern Hunan Uprising and reached the Jinggang Mountains with the Red Army in 1928, and she is counted with He Zizhen and Wu Ruolan among the "three heroines" of the Red Army there. She spent much of the following decade in underground work in Fujian, where she helped to establish the Eastern Fujian Soviet.

After 1949, Zeng held senior posts in Guangzhou, where she was the first director of the city's electric power bureau and, from 1955 to 1966, a secretary of the municipal party committee responsible for industry. During the Cultural Revolution, she was criticised and investigated again after Tao's downfall and was sent to do manual labour in rural northern Guangdong. In December 1977, she returned to work as a deputy head of the Organization Department under Hu Yaobang, where she was one of his principal assistants in reversing verdicts in political cases and took part in selecting younger cadres for promotion.

== Early life ==
Zeng was born Zeng Zhaoxue on 4 April 1911 in Yizhang County, Hunan, into a family of intellectuals. She was also known by the alias Zeng Xia. In the autumn of 1924, she entered the Third Women's Normal School of Hunan Province in Hengyang.

In August 1926, Zeng enrolled at the Hengyang Peasant Movement Training Institute. She registered under the name Zeng Zhi, explaining that she wanted to win dignity for women, as the character zhi means "will" or "aspiration". She was one of the few women at the institute. In October 1926, she joined the Chinese Communist Party (CCP), and she wrote to her mother to break off the marriage that her parents had arranged for her.

== Revolutionary career ==
After graduating in the spring of 1927, Zeng worked in the organisation department of the CCP's Hengyang prefectural committee. Later that year, she moved to Chenzhou for underground work as secretary-general of the Chen County party committee. In January 1928, she took part in the Southern Hunan Uprising. She then became secretary of the party committee office of the Seventh Division of the Workers' and Peasants' Revolutionary Army, and she went with the division to the Jinggang Mountains in April 1928.

=== Jinggang Mountains ===
In the Jinggang Mountains, Zeng served in turn as party branch secretary of the Fourth Red Army's rear hospital at Xiaojing, an officer in the army's organisation section and head of the women's group of the front committee's workers' and peasants' movement committee. In June 1928, while pregnant, she took part in the fighting at Longyuankou, and she later helped to build the Xiaojing hospital when she was more than seven months pregnant. In August 1928, she took part in the Battle of Huangyangjie. More than 130 wounded and sick soldiers at the hospital were later killed in an enemy raid. In early 1929, Zeng left the mountains with the main force of the Fourth Red Army.

After the Fourth Red Army took Changting in Fujian in March 1929, Zeng helped to arrange the marriage of Zhu De and Kang Keqing. When He Zizhen was pregnant later that year, Mao Zedong asked Zeng to look after her, and Zeng at first objected, believing that she was being asked to give up her own work.

=== Fujian ===
From June 1930, Zeng did underground work in Xiamen and Fuzhou, serving as secretary-general of the Xiamen and Fuzhou central municipal committees and as head of the organisation department of the Southern Fujian special committee. After the Red Army withdrew from Zhangzhou in 1932, the local party organisation led by her husband, Cai Xiemin, collapsed, and in October 1932, Cai and Zeng were criticised and removed from their posts.

In 1933, Zeng was posted to eastern Fujian, where she helped to establish the Eastern Fujian Soviet and served as a member of the Fu'an central county committee, head of the organisation department of the Eastern Fujian special committee and secretary of the Fuxia central county committee. In 1935, as Nationalist forces overran most of the soviet, Zeng, who was seriously ill, was sent to Guangdong for treatment, and she then lost contact with the party. She moved between Shantou, Hengyang, Yizhang, Guangzhou and Shanghai for about twenty months, supporting herself with casual work, before re-establishing contact in Shanghai in October 1936. Her departure from eastern Fujian became the basis of political investigations into her over the following decades.

=== Second Sino-Japanese War ===
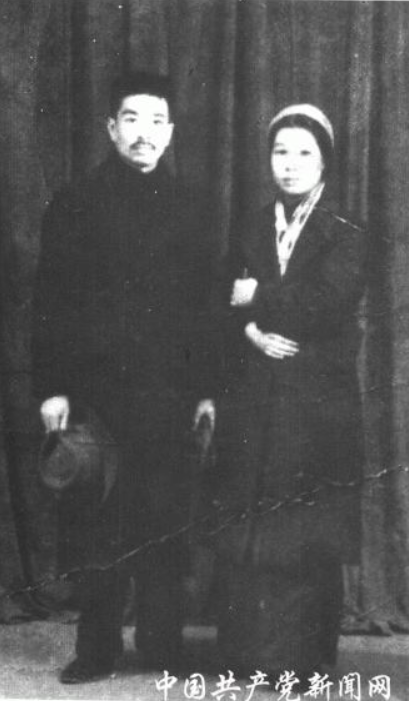
Zeng Zhi with Tao Zhu in Hankou in 1938

After the outbreak of war with Japan in 1937, Zeng was reunited in Hankou with her husband, Tao Zhu, who had been released from prison through the party's efforts. From September 1937, she was secretary of the women's committee of the provisional Hubei provincial committee, and party branch secretary and instructor at the Tangchi rural co-operative training class. In October 1938, after the fall of Wuhan, Zeng became secretary of the CCP committee for the central district of Jingmen, Dangyang and Yuan'an, which became a central county committee in February 1939. She led anti-Japanese mobilisation in the area, reorganised the local party organisation and helped to prepare guerrilla forces.

In December 1939, Zeng was sent to study at the Marxist–Leninist Academy in Yan'an, and in 1940, she became secretary-general of the Central Women's Committee. During the Yan'an Rectification Movement, Zeng was accused of having fled the Eastern Fujian Soviet and was labelled politically wavering. She was detained for investigation for a year and four months, and no conclusion was reached. In 1945, she was elected an alternate delegate to the 7th National Congress of the Chinese Communist Party.

=== Northeast China ===
In June 1945, Zeng travelled south with a military column intended to set up a base area in Guangdong and Guangxi, but after Japan's surrender, the column was redirected to Northeast China. In the northeast, Zeng was a member of the Shenyang municipal party committee and secretary of its Tiexi district committee, a member of the Liaoning–Jilin provincial committee and deputy secretary of two of its prefectural committees, and later a member of the standing committee of the Shenyang committee and head of its workers' department.

== Political career ==
=== Guangdong ===
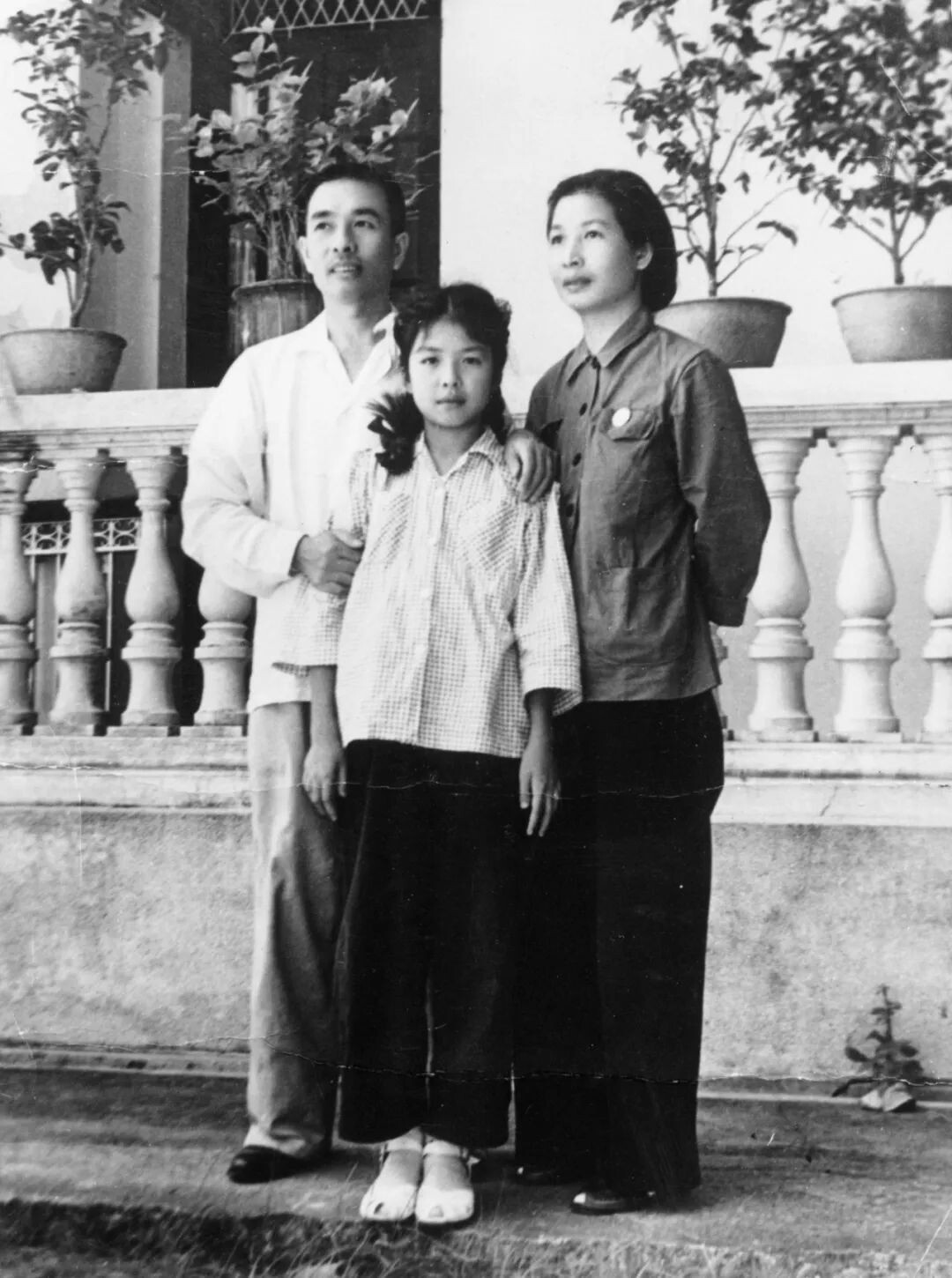
Zeng Zhi with Tao Zhu and daughter Tao Siliang, 1954

From May 1949, Zeng was deputy head of the materials takeover department of the Wuhan military control commission and a member of the Central South Military and Political Commission. In 1952, she was transferred to Guangdong as deputy head of the industry department of the Central South Bureau and the first director and party secretary of the Guangzhou Electric Power Bureau. Describing herself as a newcomer to the industry, she set up her office in the Xicun power plant and housed her family in the workers' dormitory. The bureau's headquarters, the Hua'an Building, became known as the "ancestral home" of electric power in Guangzhou, and it was restored and opened as the Guangzhou Electric Power Exhibition Hall in December 2018.

From 1955 to 1966, Zeng was a secretary of the CCP Guangzhou municipal committee responsible for industry, and she was also a member, standing committee member and alternate secretary of the Guangdong provincial committee. In 1957, after a two-year investigation by the Guangdong provincial committee, the Organization Department approved a conclusion that her history was clear and that she had no political problems. She was the founding president of the Guangzhou Institute of Technology, now part of Guangdong University of Technology, and of the Guangzhou Mechanical and Electrical Industry School, both founded in 1958.

=== Cultural Revolution ===
重上战场我亦难，感君情厚逼云端。
无情白发催寒暑，蒙垢余生抑苦酸。
病马也知嘶枥晚，枯葵更觉怯霜残。
如烟往事俱忘却，心底无私天地宽。

To return to the battlefield once more is hard for me,
Yet I am moved by your affection, profound as the soaring clouds.
Relentless graying hair marks the rush of seasons,
Disgraced in these remaining years, I suppress my grief and bitterness.
A sick horse still knows to neigh at its trough in old age,
A withered sunflower fears even more the harshness of the ruinous frost.
Let all past affairs, like smoke, be forgotten—
When the heart is selfless, heaven and earth open wide.

— Tao Zhu, "Presented to Zeng Zhi (Part II)" (1969)

At the start of the Cultural Revolution in 1966, Tao Zhu was transferred to Beijing as executive secretary of the Secretariat, and Zeng, then a deputy secretary of the Guangzhou committee, went to Beijing on sick leave. After Tao was purged in early 1967, Zeng stayed with him while he was confined in Zhongnanhai. She was criticised as his wife, and the investigation into her past in eastern Fujian was reopened. In her memoirs, she attributed the fact that she was not physically assaulted to her acquaintance with Mao from the Jinggang Mountains. When Tao was moved to Hefei in 1969, Zeng was sent to the countryside in northern Guangdong to do manual labour, and the couple did not meet again. Tao died in Hefei on 30 November 1969.

In December 1978, the Third Plenary Session of the 11th Central Committee reversed the verdict on Tao, and a memorial meeting was held for him in Beijing.

=== Organization Department ===
In December 1977, Zeng returned to work as a deputy head of the Organization Department, which Hu Yaobang headed from that month. She was one of Hu's principal assistants in reviewing and reversing the verdicts in political cases. By her account, Hu described the backlog of cases at his first meeting with the department's staff as a mountain, citing the "sixty-one renegades" case, the cases left by successive political campaigns and those from the Yan'an "rescue campaign". The department then set up groups to receive veteran cadres, to place more than six thousand cadres awaiting posts in central government bodies and to correct the cases of people labelled rightists.

Zeng's portfolio included the assessment and training of cadres in the economic and scientific sectors. At the time, the party was campaigning to promote middle-aged and younger cadres, and in 1980, the principal leaders of more than thirty central government bodies were on average 63 years old. Rather than relying on personnel files and reports, Zeng, then about seventy, visited factories, mines and research institutes to observe candidates at work. The approach preceded the department's large-scale selection of "third echelon" successor cadres in 1983 and 1984.

At the 12th National Congress in September 1982, Zeng was elected to the Central Advisory Commission, where she was deputy secretary of its provisional party committee. She retired in 1983. After Hu Yaobang was removed as general secretary in 1987, she wrote an account of his work at the Organization Department, which she completed in hospital. It was later published in Hong Kong under the title Hu Yaobang Outside the Red Wall.

== Later life and death ==
Zeng did not use her position to obtain jobs for her family. When her eldest son's son, Shi Jinlong, came to Beijing in the 1980s to ask for her help in obtaining an urban household registration, she declined, saying that the country still needed peasants. In 1987, she returned to the Jinggang Mountains for the 60th anniversary of the base area and shared a meal with her son's family, asking that they receive no special treatment.

In her last years, Zeng was treated for lymphoma and underwent twelve courses of chemotherapy over two years. Weighing about 37 kilograms (82 lb), she completed her account of Hu Yaobang and an autobiography of 400,000 characters in hospital. She lost consciousness on 16 June 1998, and her last words, on being told that her autobiography would be published, were a request not to be praised too highly. She died in Beijing on 21 June 1998, at the age of 87.

After her death, Tao Siliang found Zeng's will in an old envelope. It asked that there be no memorial meeting, farewell ceremony or mourning hall, that her body be given to a hospital for dissection and the remainder cremated, and that part of her ashes be buried under a tree in the Jinggang Mountains and the rest beneath a boulder on Baiyun Mountain in Guangzhou. It also asked that her death be announced only three months later, without a biography. She had written to the Central Committee asking for a simple funeral, and the Organization Department held no farewell ceremony.

Zeng's body was cremated on 26 June without public notice, although more than three hundred people came to the hospital. The head of the Organization Department, Zhang Quanjing, accompanied the cortège. On 1 July, her family scattered part of her ashes on the hillside behind the former Xiaojing Red Army hospital, about 400 metres (1,300 ft) from the grave of the soldiers killed there, and planted a cypress. The gravestone reads "Spirit returned to Jinggang: veteran Red Army soldier Zeng Zhi". On 4 July, the rest of her ashes were buried with part of Tao Zhu's ashes beneath the boulder on Baiyun Mountain.

== Personal life ==
=== Marriages ===
In 1927, Zeng married Xia Mingzhen, the dean of studies at the Hengyang training institute, who also headed the prefectural party organisation department. She later wrote that the marriage had been arranged at the request of the party organisation. In Chenzhou, Xia was secretary of the Chen County party committee, and in March 1928, he was killed by a crowd during the "anti-white incident" in the county, at the age of 21.

Shortly afterwards, Zeng married Cai Xiemin, the party representative of the Seventh Division. In her memoirs, she described their relationship as closer to that of comrades-in-arms, and she wrote that she regarded marriage at the time as secondary, because revolutionaries could be killed at any moment. According to her memoirs, she ended the marriage in October 1932, after the two had been removed from their posts in Zhangzhou and before Cai left for Shanghai to appeal against the decision. Cai was betrayed and arrested in April 1934 and was executed in Zhangzhou in July that year.

In Fuzhou, Zeng and Tao Zhu were assigned to work together posing as a married couple, and their relationship became a real marriage, which accounts date to 1932 or early 1933. Tao was later arrested by the Nationalist authorities and sentenced to life imprisonment, and the couple were reunited after his release in 1937. Their marriage lasted 37 years, until his death in 1969.

=== Children ===
Zeng had three sons and a daughter, and the three sons were given to other families as infants. Her eldest son was born on 7 November 1928 in the Jinggang Mountains. When he was 26 days old, with the army about to move, she entrusted him to Shi Libao, a deputy company commander in the 32nd Regiment, who raised him under the name Shi Laifa. Tao Siliang has written that he was the posthumous son of Xia Mingzhen. In 1951, Zeng had colleagues search for him, and the two were reunited in Guangzhou after more than twenty years apart. He returned to the mountains, took the name Cai Shihong and worked as a farmer and forest ranger.

Her second son, known as Tie Niu, was born in 1931. When he was a little over sixty days old, the Xiamen central municipal committee, which was short of funds, decided without her knowledge to give him to a doctor surnamed Ye in exchange for one hundred silver dollars. Zeng accepted the decision, and the child died of smallpox a few weeks later.

Her third son, Cai Chunhua, was born in February 1933 and was given to another family thirteen days later. Zeng traced him in 1950, and he later worked as an assistant engineer in Lechang County, Guangdong.

Her daughter with Tao Zhu, Tao Siliang, was born in Yan'an in 1941. When her parents left for the northeast in 1945, she was left in the care of a nursery in Yan'an. She later worked as a military doctor for about twenty years and then in charitable work.

== Legacy ==
Zeng is counted with He Zizhen and Wu Ruolan among the "three heroines" of the Red Army in the Jinggang Mountains. Party media and discipline-inspection bodies have presented her as an example of frugality and of refusing privileges for her family. At a symposium marking the centenary of her birth in April 2011, Li Yuanchao, then head of the Organization Department, called on officials to learn from her revolutionary spirit and character. An illustrated biography by Wang Qingqing was published that year, and an earlier biography for young readers by Xin Xuezi had appeared in 1991. Her memoirs have been noted for their frankness about her early marriages, the surrender of her sons and the investigations she underwent. Tao Siliang wrote in a funeral inscription that her mother had given more than a woman and more than a mother could give.

== Works ==
- Accounts by Heroines, part two (Jiangxi People's Publishing House, 1988)
- A Survivor of the Revolution: Zeng Zhi's Memoirs, two volumes (Guangdong People's Publishing House, 1999)
- Back from a Hundred Battles: Zeng Zhi's Memoirs (People's Literature Publishing House, 2011)
- A Survivor of the Revolution: Zeng Zhi's Memoirs (Sichuan People's Publishing House, 2020)
- A Factual Record of Hu Yaobang at the Central Organization Department, published in Hong Kong as Hu Yaobang Outside the Red Wall (Zhonghua Ernü Publishing House)
