= Chen Xujing =

Chinese sociologist

- 陈序经

Vice President of Nankai University
- In office 1964 – 16 February 1967

President of Jinan University
- In office 1963–1964

Vice President of Sun Yat-sen University
- In office 1956–1963

President of Lingnan University (Guangzhou)
- In office 1948–1954

Personal details
- Born: 1 September 1903 Wenchang, Hainan, China
- Died: 16 February 1967 (aged 63) Tianjin, China
- Education: Fudan University; University of Illinois (MA, PhD)

Chen Xujing (Chinese: 陈序经; pinyin: Chén Xùjīng; 1 September 1903 – 16 February 1967) was a leading Chinese sociologist.

== Biography ==
Chen Xujing was born in Hainan. He was schooled in Singapore and at Lingnan Middle School, at which he enrolled in 1920. He graduated from Fudan University in 1925. After receiving a PhD in Political Science from the University of Illinois in 1928, he published his thesis on theories of sovereignty in the following year. While holding a sociology post at Lingnan University, he travelled to study in Germany. He became a professor at Nankai University, heading the Economic Research Institute and School of Politics and Economics, and serving as vice president of the university. After serving as Vice President of Zhongshan University, he became President of Lingnan University in 1948, and subsequently President of Jinan University in Guangzhou.

== Works ==
- Recent theories of sovereignty, 1929
- China and Southeastern Asia, 1944
