= Air Force Medical Center of the Chinese People's Liberation Army =

Military hospital in Beijing, China

Coordinates: 39°55′26″N 116°18′01″E

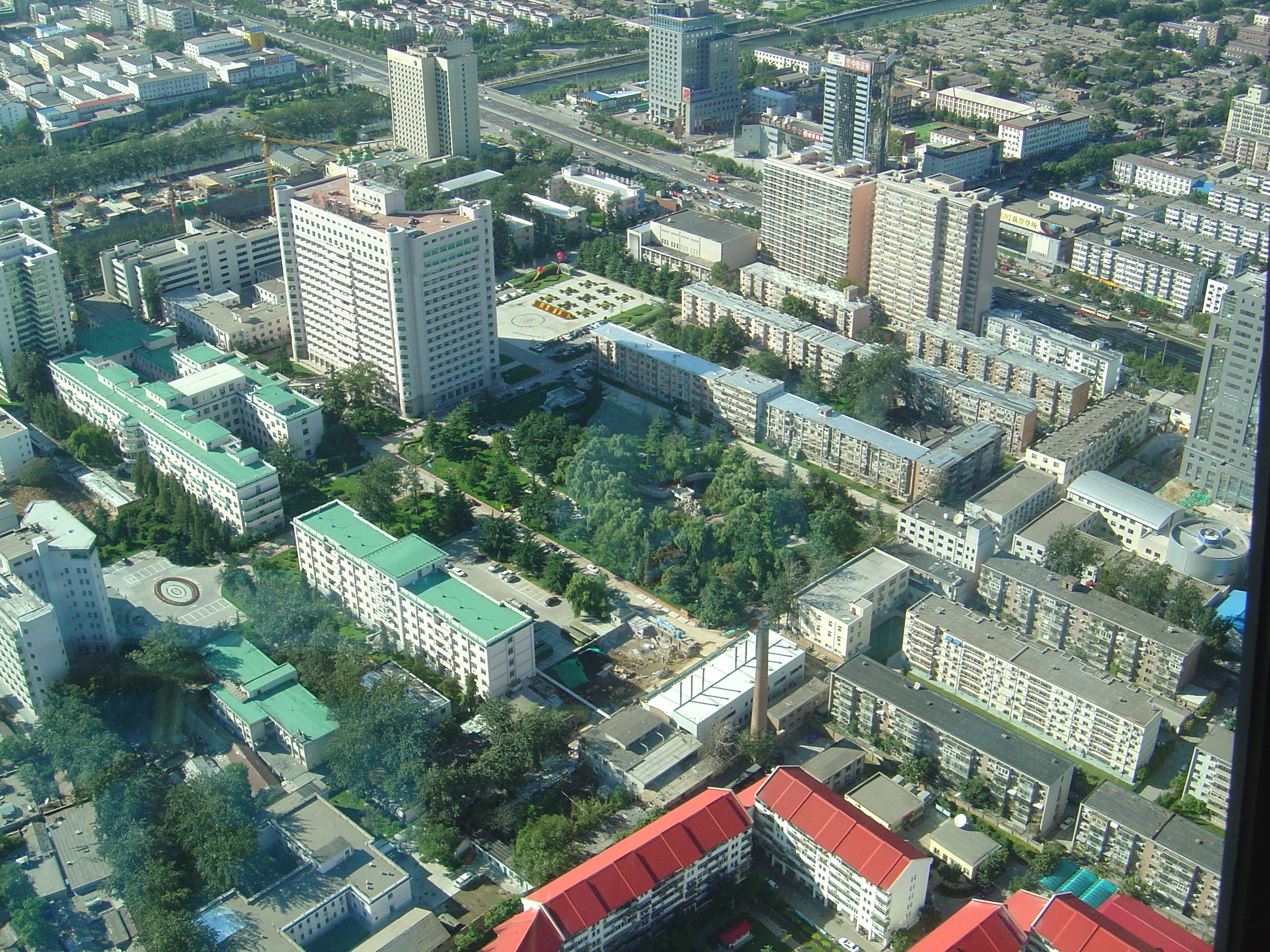
Highrise block in the top left quarter is the Air Force Medical Center (then known as the Air Force General Hospital when this photo was taken in 2004)

Air Force Medical Center of the Chinese People's Liberation Army, formerly known as the People's Liberation Army Air Force General Hospital, located in Beijing is a general hospital and the top medical facility of the air force.

== History ==
In May 1950, the People's Liberation Army Air Force decided to build an Air Force Hospital in Beijing. In July 1954, it was named "The General Hospital of the Air Force of the Chinese People's Liberation Army." On October 25, 1956, based on the 11th Army Hospital of the Army, the Air Force General Hospital was founded. Since its establishment, it has been responsible for the diagnosis and treatment of aviation diseases and common diseases for air force pilots. It is responsible for the health protection and disease treatment of air force and joint logistics forces, and provide health assistance to local medical and health institutions.

Song Chen, a neurologist from Air Force Medical Center, was arrested by the Federal Bureau of Investigation (FBI) in California, US, in July 2020, and charged with obtaining a visa by material false statements. She was accused of lying about her connections to the Chinese military in her application of a visa to visit Stanford University as a neurologist. Federal prosecutors claimed that she was a member of the People's Liberation Army when she entered the U.S. in 2018 and when she was living there.
