= Guangfeng, Shangrao =

Guangfeng 广丰区 Kwangfeng
- District
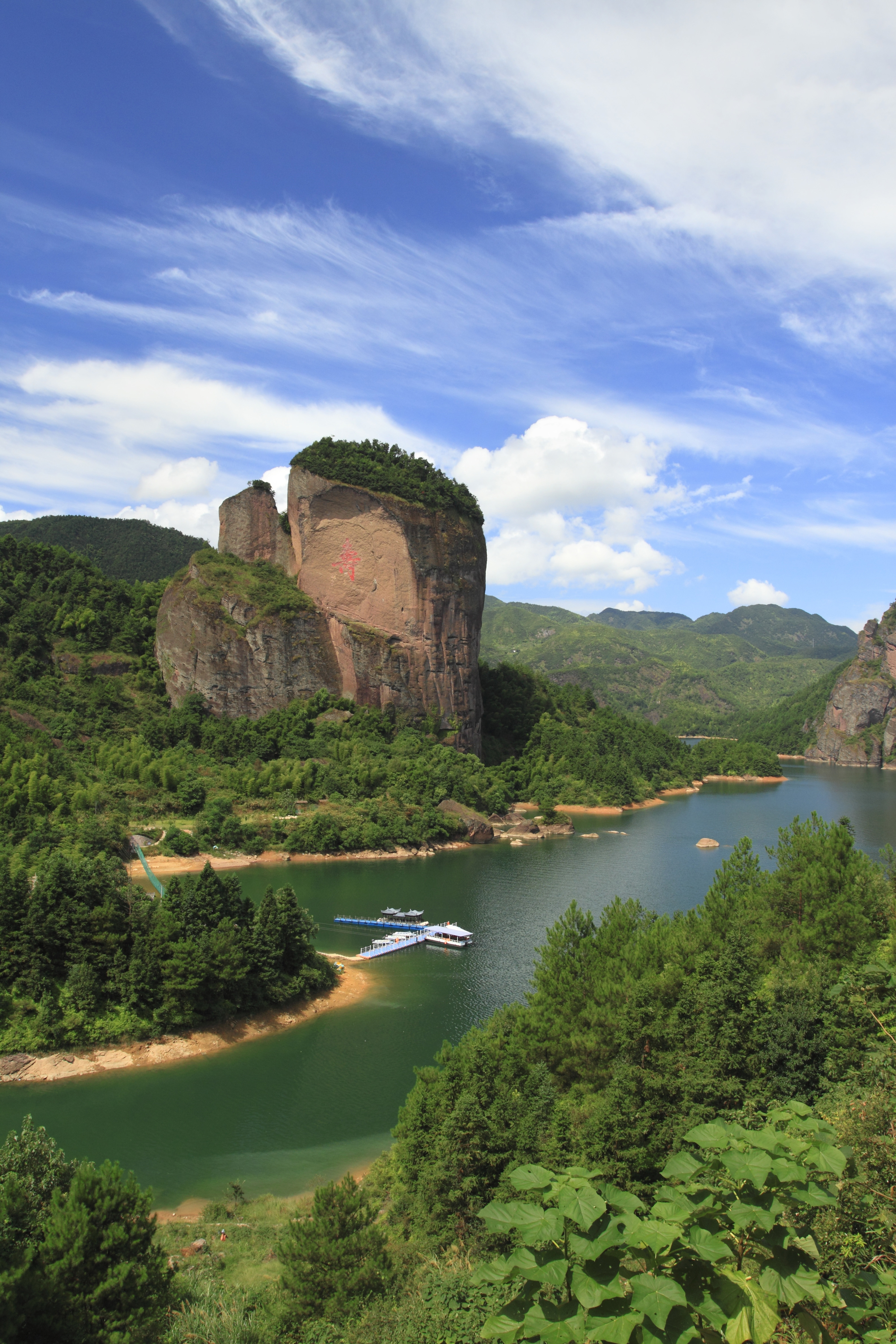
- Juntan Reservoir

- Location in Jiangxi
- Coordinates: 28°26′18″N 118°10′46″E
- Country: People's Republic of China
- Province: Jiangxi
- Prefecture-level city: Shangrao
- Capital: Yongfeng

Area
  - Total: 1,377.79 km^{2} (531.97 sq mi)

Population (2017)
  - Total: 974,367
  - Density: 707.196/km^{2} (1,831.63/sq mi)
- Time zone: UTC+8 (China Standard)
- Postal code: 334600
- Division code: GFQ (Telephone code: 0793)
- Vehicle registration: 赣E
- Website: www.gfx.gov.cn

Guangfeng District (simplified Chinese: 广丰区; traditional Chinese: 廣豐區; pinyin: Guǎngfēng Qū; lit. 'Wide and luxuriant') is a district of the city of Shangrao, located in Northeastern Jiangxi Province, Eastern China.

The easternmost county-level division of Jiangxi, Guangfeng borders Zhejiang and Fujian provinces. It covers 1,377.79 km^{2} (531.97 sq mi).

The population is 760,000 people.

== History ==
The district was first established during the Tang dynasty in 758 as a county, then repealed in 812. In 1074, during the Song dynasty, the district was reestablished as a county.

== Administration ==
Guangfeng has been a county for over 1,300 years. Administratively, the district is part of the prefecture-level city of Shangrao. The county administers 23 townships.

At present, Guangfeng District has 3 subdistricts, 16 towns and 4 townships.

3 subdistricts

- Yongfeng (永丰街道)
- Lulin (芦林街道)
- Fengxi (丰溪街道)

16 towns

- Wudu (五都镇)
- Yangkou (洋口镇)
- Hengshan (横山镇)
- Tongfan (桐畈镇)
- Hufeng (湖丰镇)
- Danan (大南镇)
- Paishan (排山镇)
- Maocun (毛村镇)
- Jiandi (枧底镇)
- Quanbo (泉波镇)
- Huqiao (壶桥镇)
- Xiafeng (霞峰镇)
- Xiaxi (下溪镇)
- Wucun (吴村镇)
- Shatian (沙田镇)
- Tongboshan (铜钹山镇)

4 townships

- Dashi (大石乡)
- Dongyang (东阳乡)
- Songfeng (嵩峰乡)
- Shaoyang (少阳乡)

== Climate ==
The climate is temperate, with abundant rainfall during the monsoon season. It has clearly differentiated summers and winters.

Climate data for Guangfeng, elevation 150 m (490 ft), (1991–2020 normals, extremes 1965–present)
Month	Jan	Feb	Mar	Apr	May	Jun	Jul	Aug	Sep	Oct	Nov	Dec	Year
Record high °C (°F)	27.4 (81.3)	29.6 (85.3)	34.3 (93.7)	35.4 (95.7)	37.2 (99.0)	38.0 (100.4)	41.0 (105.8)	41.4 (106.5)	39.0 (102.2)	37.2 (99.0)	32.4 (90.3)	25.9 (78.6)	41.4 (106.5)
Mean daily maximum °C (°F)	10.8 (51.4)	13.5 (56.3)	17.4 (63.3)	23.6 (74.5)	28.0 (82.4)	30.1 (86.2)	34.6 (94.3)	34.2 (93.6)	30.5 (86.9)	25.5 (77.9)	19.5 (67.1)	13.4 (56.1)	23.4 (74.2)
Daily mean °C (°F)	6.4 (43.5)	8.8 (47.8)	12.5 (54.5)	18.3 (64.9)	23.0 (73.4)	25.7 (78.3)	29.4 (84.9)	28.9 (84.0)	25.3 (77.5)	20.0 (68.0)	14.2 (57.6)	8.3 (46.9)	18.4 (65.1)
Mean daily minimum °C (°F)	3.4 (38.1)	5.4 (41.7)	8.9 (48.0)	14.4 (57.9)	19.2 (66.6)	22.4 (72.3)	25.3 (77.5)	25.1 (77.2)	21.5 (70.7)	16.0 (60.8)	10.3 (50.5)	4.8 (40.6)	14.7 (58.5)
Record low °C (°F)	−5.8 (21.6)	−3.9 (25.0)	−3.1 (26.4)	1.9 (35.4)	9.3 (48.7)	13.3 (55.9)	18.9 (66.0)	19.0 (66.2)	12.7 (54.9)	4.0 (39.2)	−1.8 (28.8)	−9.6 (14.7)	−9.6 (14.7)
Average precipitation mm (inches)	87.5 (3.44)	104.9 (4.13)	207.4 (8.17)	232.2 (9.14)	219.5 (8.64)	367.5 (14.47)	149.8 (5.90)	104.5 (4.11)	73.0 (2.87)	49.4 (1.94)	92.8 (3.65)	74.6 (2.94)	1,763.1 (69.4)
Average precipitation days (≥ 0.1 mm)	13.6	13.7	18.4	16.8	16.2	18.1	11.7	12.2	9.2	7.4	10.1	10.7	158.1
Average snowy days	2.8	1.8	0.2	0	0	0	0	0	0	0	0.1	0.9	5.8
Average relative humidity (%)	77	76	76	75	75	80	73	73	73	72	76	75	75
Mean monthly sunshine hours	89.8	90.9	100.7	126.6	148.1	133.9	230.8	220.1	182.5	169.2	131.5	120.1	1,744.2
Percentage possible sunshine	27	29	27	33	35	32	54	55	50	48	41	38	39
Source: China Meteorological Administrationall-time May low

== Economy ==
Guangfeng was once a poor district, but now it is one of the wealthiest counties of Jiangxi. The most famous industry of the district is the tobacco industry. The GDP of 2005 is 7.29 billion.

== Features ==
Guangfeng's most famous feature is Boshan Temple, which lies in the west of the county. The Buddhist temple has a history over 1000 years. Xin Qiji, the famous poet of the South Song dynasty, visited it often.

Sheshantou Site, in Guangfeng District, is an important Neolithic archaeological site of Jiangxi Province.

== Gallery ==
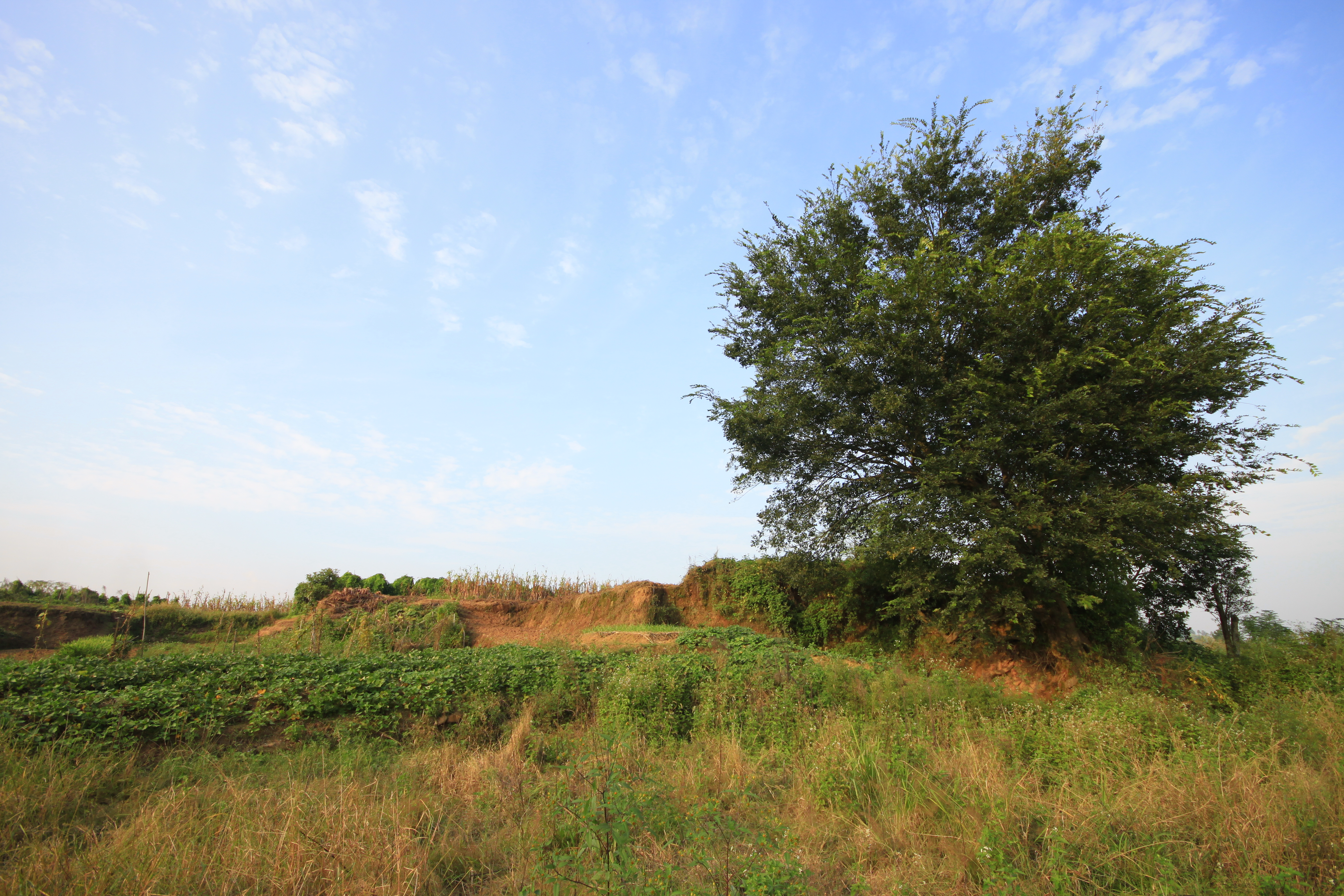
Sheshantou Site

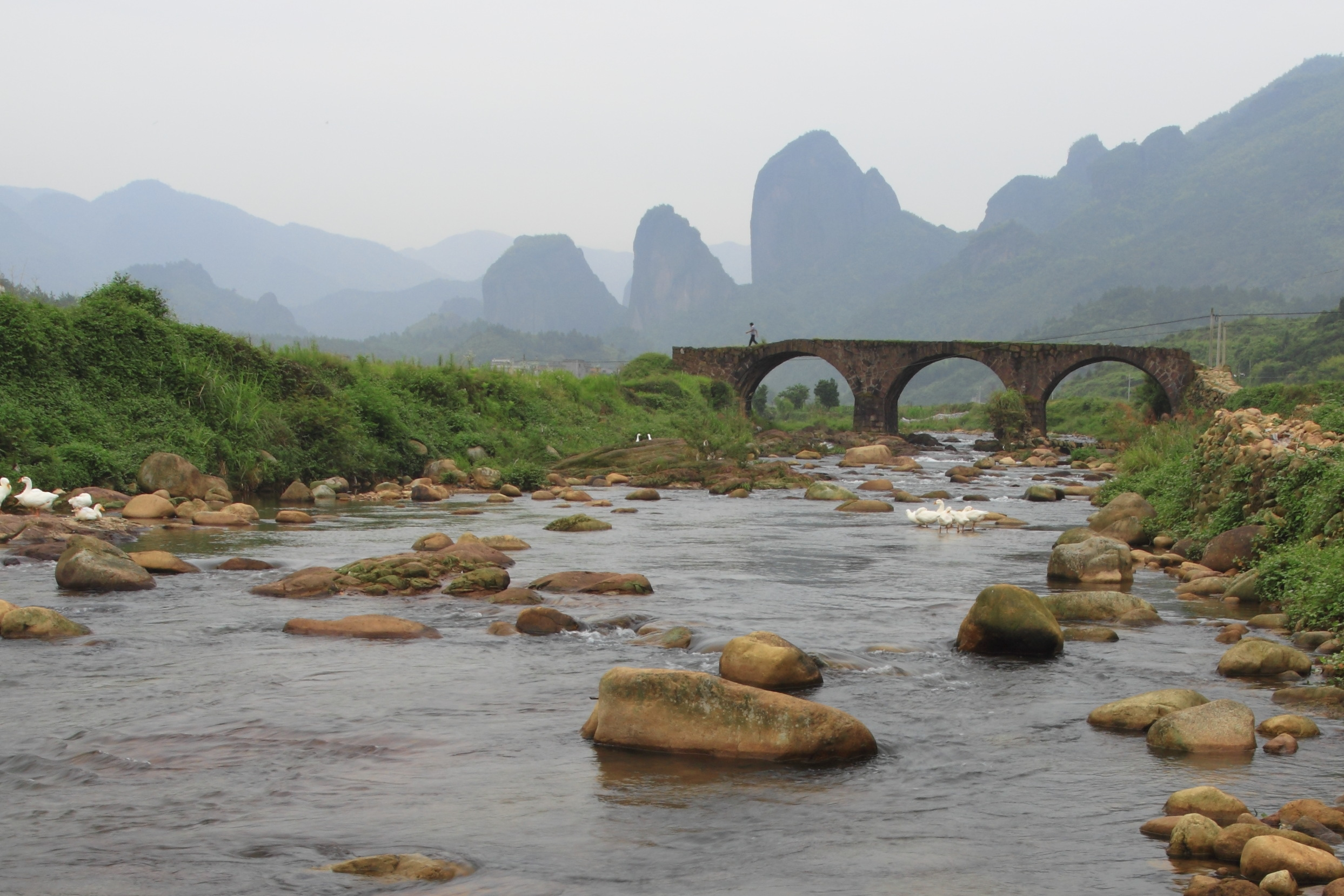
Liushiyan Hill

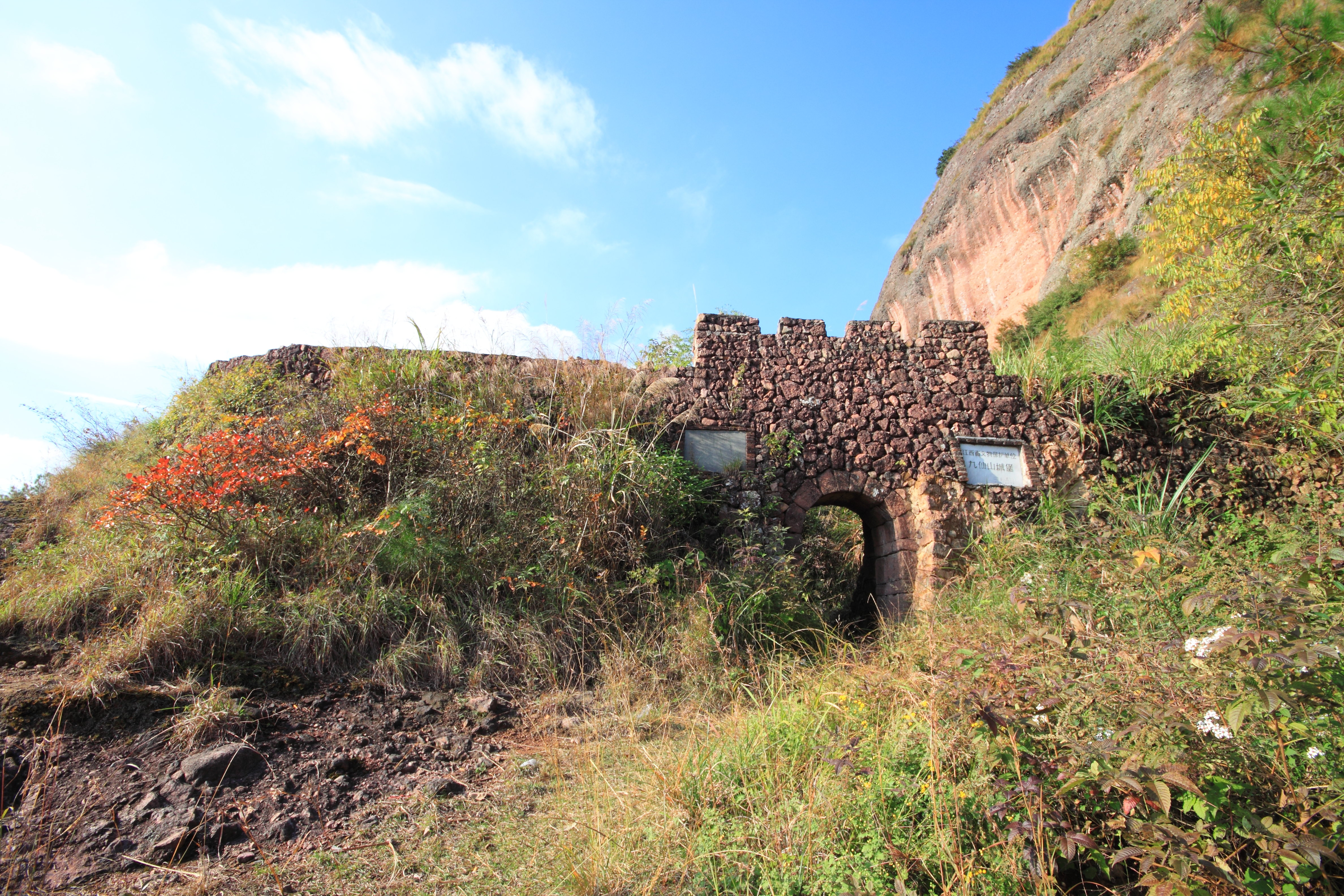
Jiuxianshan Castle

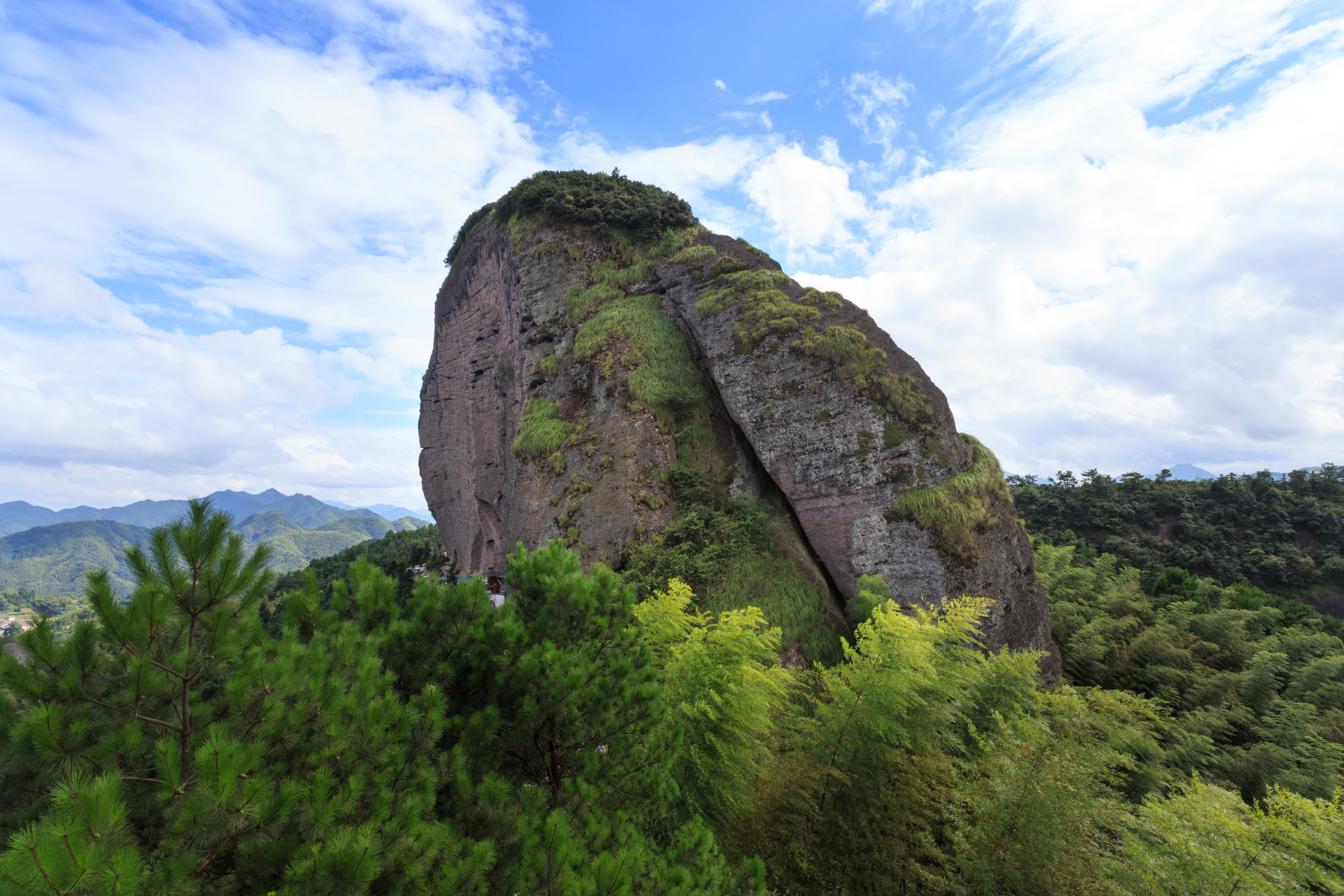
Baihuayan Hill

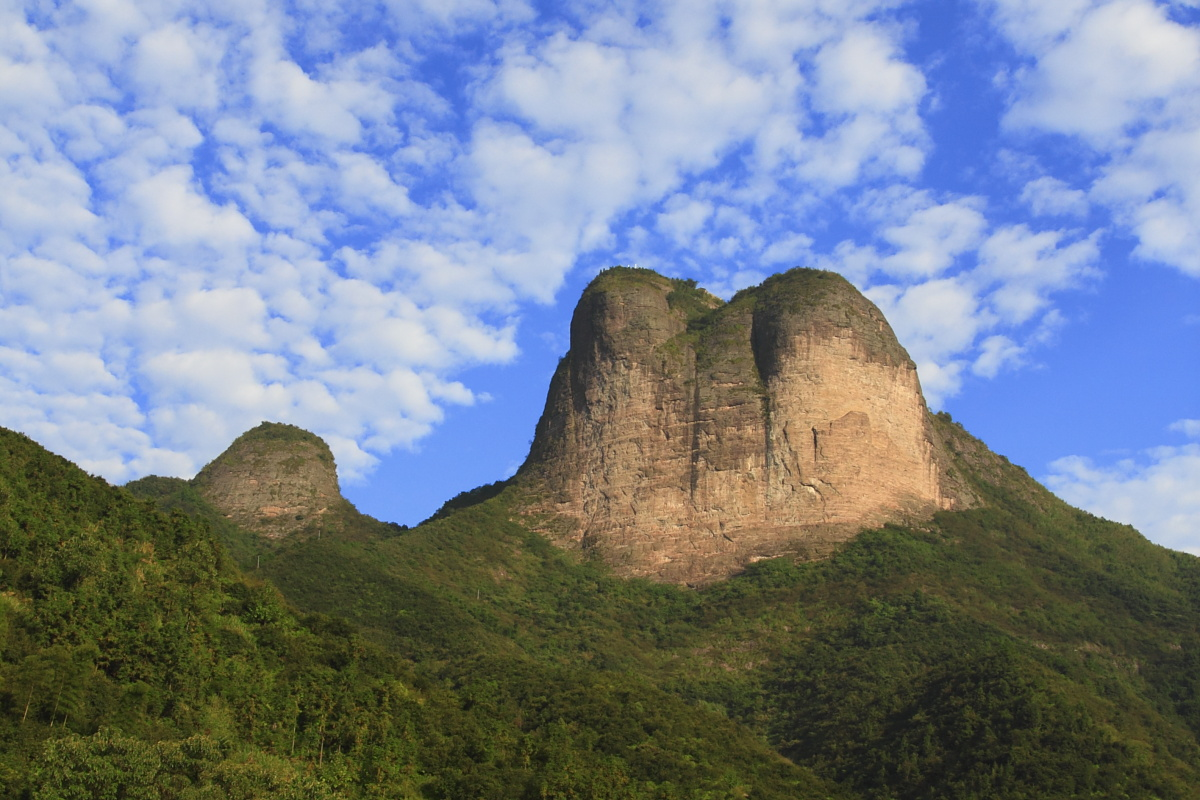
Yushi Hill

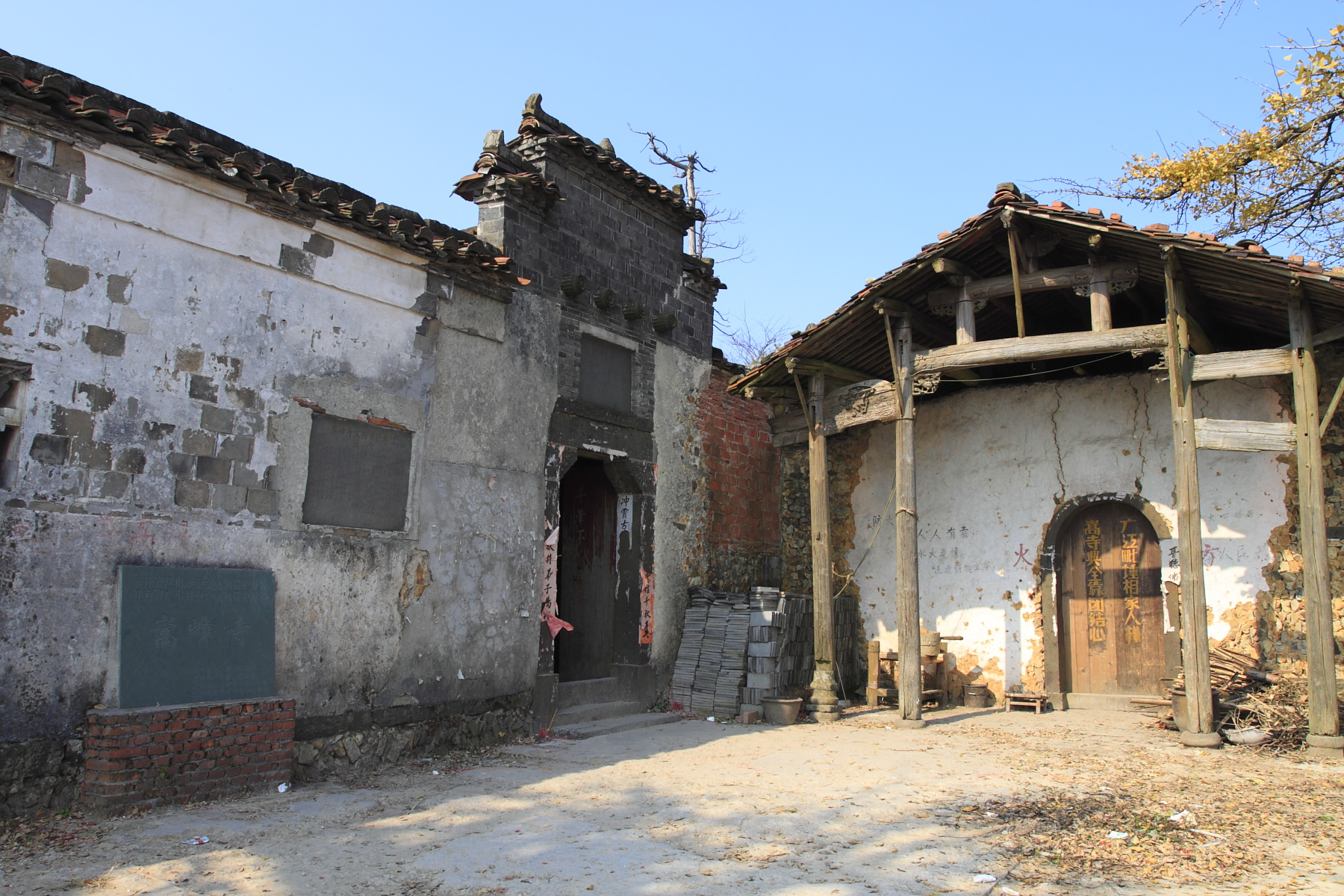
Songfeng Temple

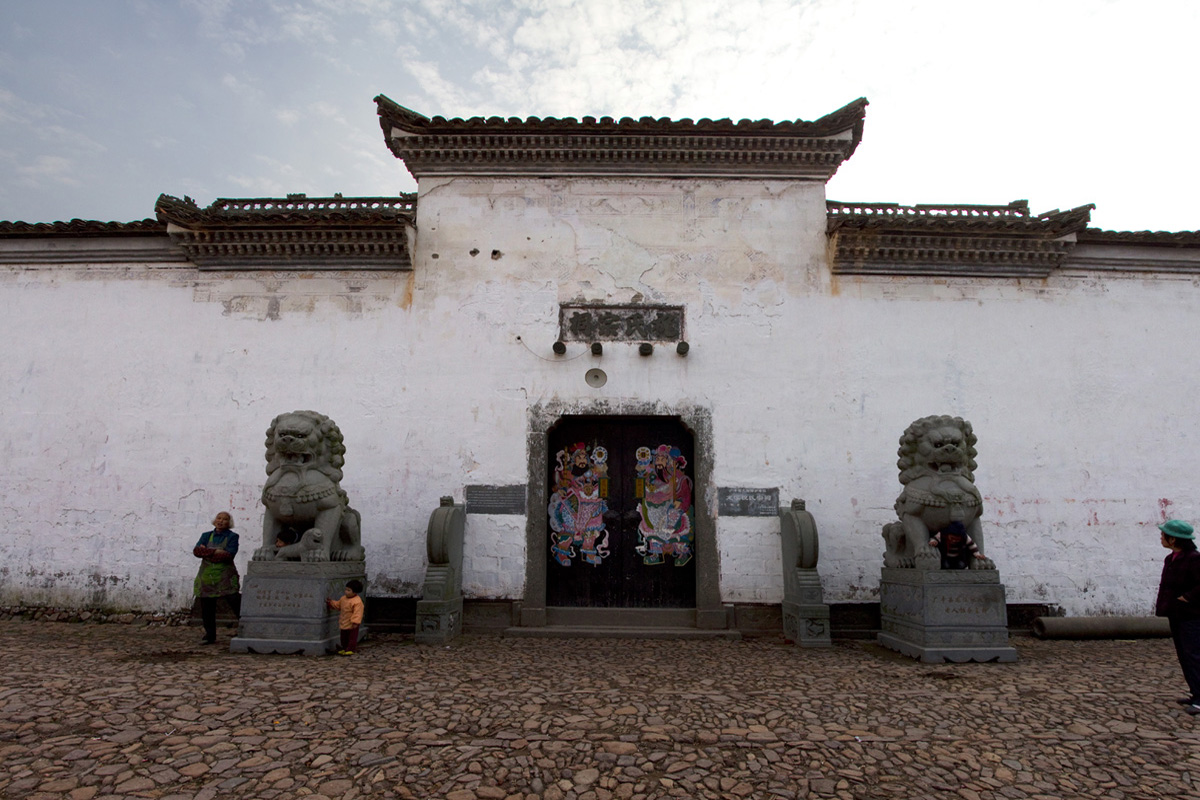
Zhu's ancestral hall in Longxi
