= Military ranks of the Soviet Union (1943–1955) =

Between 1943 and 1955, the ranks and insignia of the Soviet Armed Forces were characterised by a number of changes, including the reintroduction of rank insignia badges and the adoption of a number of higher ranks.

== Changes ==
In conjunction with the permanent increase of the manpower strength of the Soviet armed forces, the service branches and arms were formed by orders of the People' Commissariat of Defence, consisting of artillery, air force, air defence forces, signals corps, corps of engineers and the armoured corps. Major combat support units up to command level were established. This process was characterized by a need for well qualified command staff, in a suitable rank structure. The Soviet state – and party administration – responded to these challenges by the introduction of additional higher ranks, as well as by reintroducing the traditional Russian rank insignia.

A new rank group at OF-9 level (equivalent to the general of the branch in the Wehrmacht and the Imperial Russian Army) was introduced, named marshal of the branch or chief marshal of the branch.

In January 1943 the ranks of marshal of the air force, marshal of the artillery and marshal of the armoured corps came into existence. In October 1943 it was followed by the additional ranks marshal of the communication troops, and marshal of the engineer troops, and the equivalent chief marshal of the branch ranks were added.

== Generalissimo of the Soviet Union ==
The highest rank of Generalissimo of the Soviet Union (Russian: Генерали́ссимус Сове́тского Сою́за) was created in October 1943, as an individual award to Stalin, the Head of Government and party chief, and functioned as supreme commander on all Soviet armed forces. Promotion to this rank was limited explicitly to wartime. The instruction was conveyed by an order to the front commanders-in-chief on 26 June 1945, however, Stalin refused to officially implement the rank.

== Ranks and distinction insignia for the land forces and air force ==
The introduction of new distinction insignia to the officer corps of the Red Army came by order of the Presidium of the Supreme Soviet on 6 January 1943. Selected were two versions of shoulder straps or epaulettes, one for everyday uniforms and the second for field use (breadth 6 cm, length 14 to 16 cm, depending on body size). On 15 January 1943 the introduction of new uniforms was decided.

=== Corps colours ===
The corps colours that were introduced in 1935, remained in use with minor changes. The padding of the newly introduced shoulder straps were made from wool cloth, designed in branch of service colours with piping. Command staff wore silver or gold stars and characteristic metallic branch badges.

==== Enlisted men and non-commissioned officers ====
The shoulder board padding indicated the appropriate corps colour of service branch, corps or special appointment, with coloured border piping.

Colour			Branch
Padding	Piping	Field piping	Branch
Raspberry	Black	Raspberry	Infantry (generic motorised rifles or motorised infantry)
Cobalt blue	Black	Cobalt blue	Cavalry
Sky blue	Black	Sky blue	Aviation troops and air force
Black	Red	Red	Artillery & armoured corps
Dark green	Red	Dark green	Medical troops, veterinarian service
Black	Black	Black	Technical troops

==== Junior and senior officers ====
Piping	Branch
Cobalt blue	Cavalry
Raspberry	Army generic infantry, motorised rifles and logistics
Red	Artillery, armoured corps, medical troops and veterinarian service
Sky blue	Aviation troops and air force
Black	Technical troops

==== General officers ====
Piping	Branch
Deep red ("general's red")	Army generic infantry, motorised rifles and logistics
Sky blue	Aviation troops and air force
Raspberry	All other uses

==== Any other insignia ====
Regimental numbers in gold lettering were placed on other ranks' shoulder straps along with the emblem of the armed service, branch, special troop, or appointment. For commanders of battle units or task forces the emblem was gold coloured, for others it was silver.

=== Enlisted men and non-commissioned officers ===
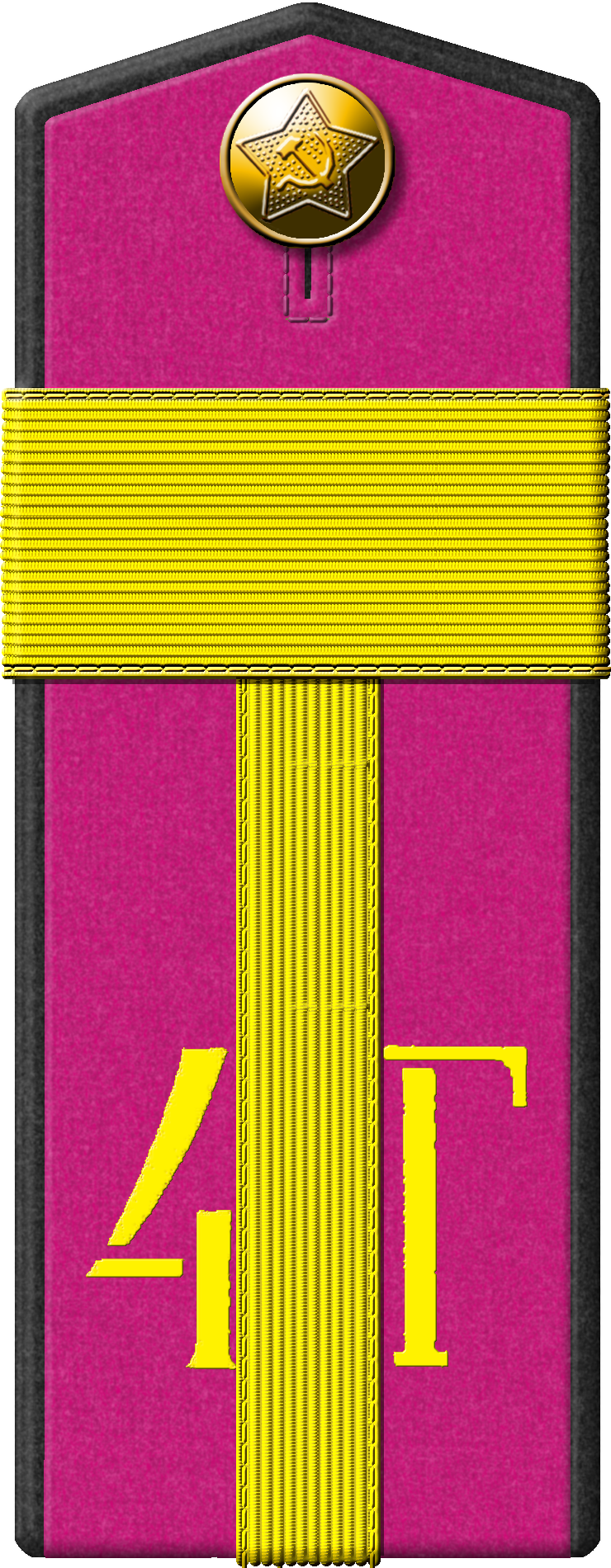
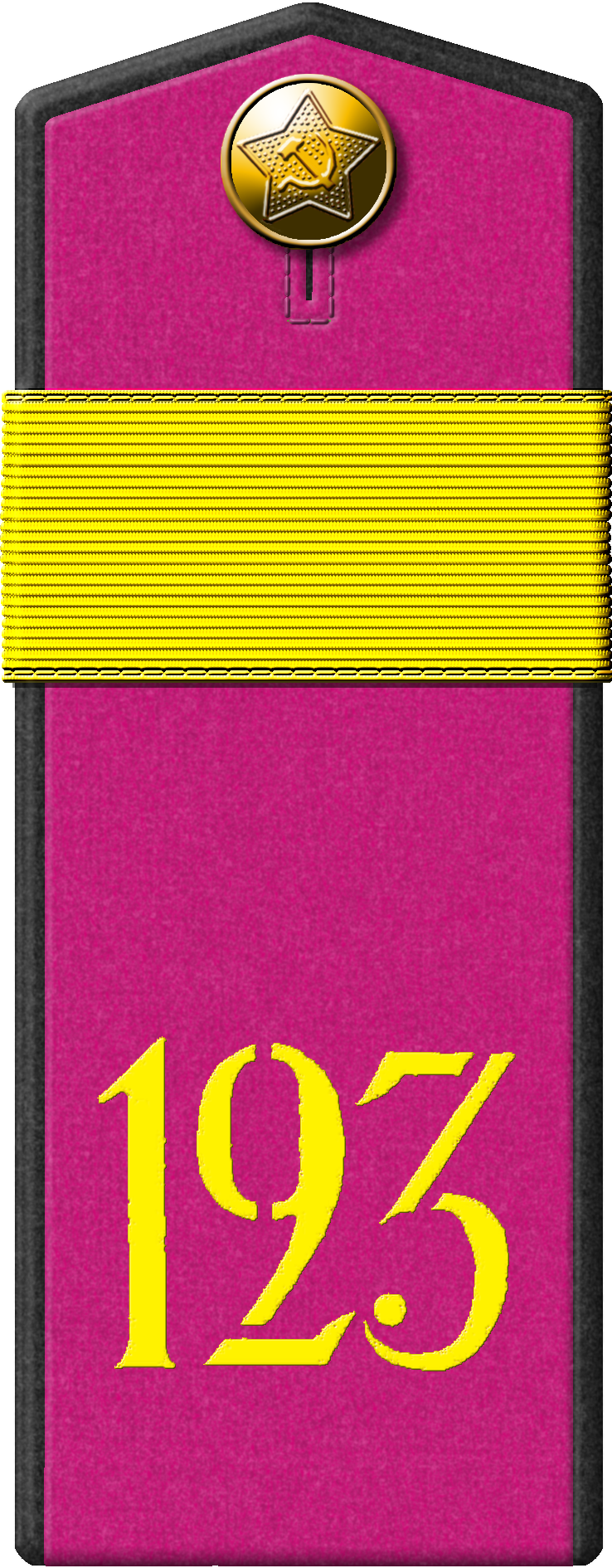
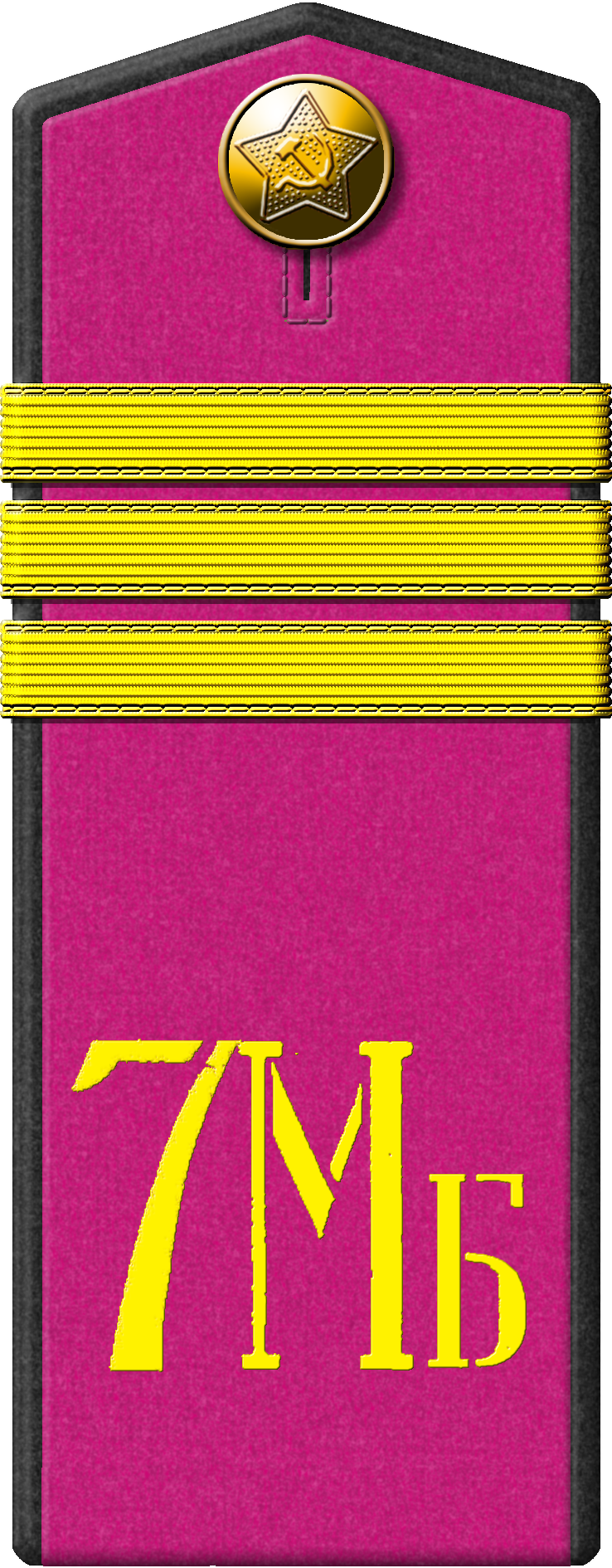
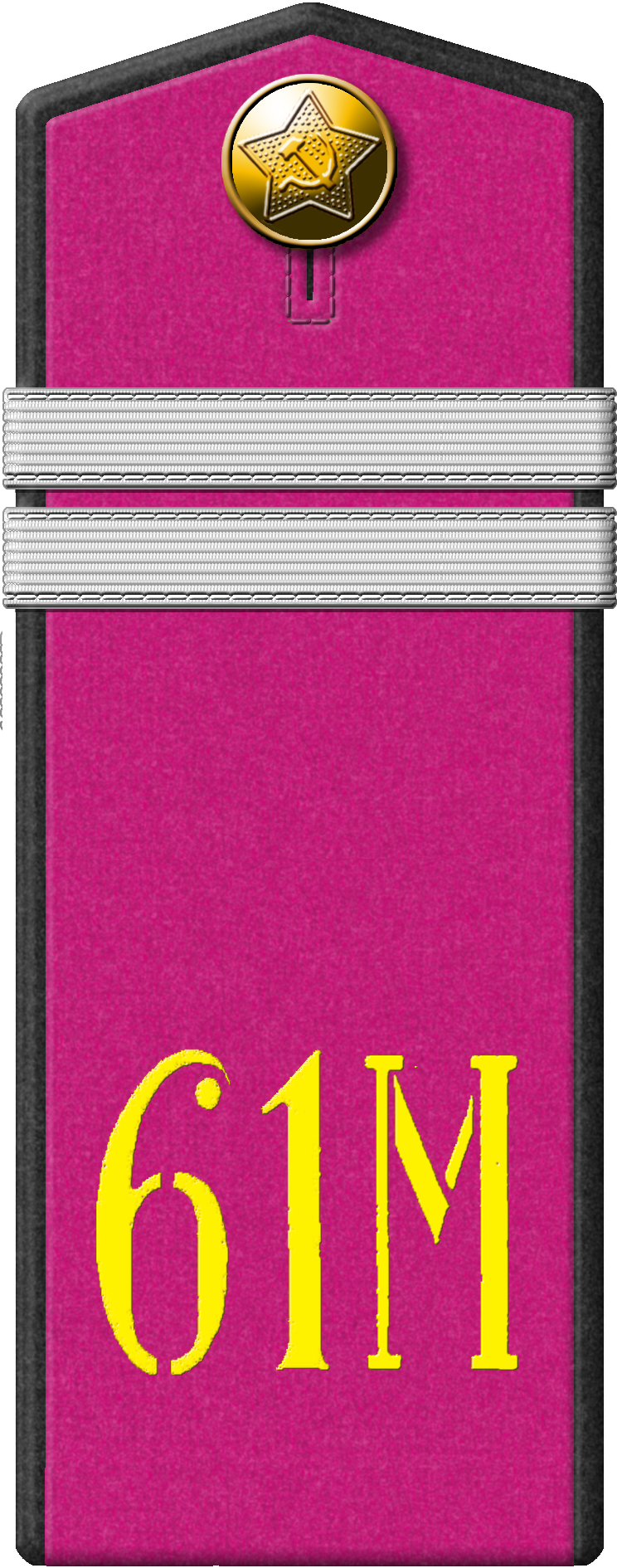
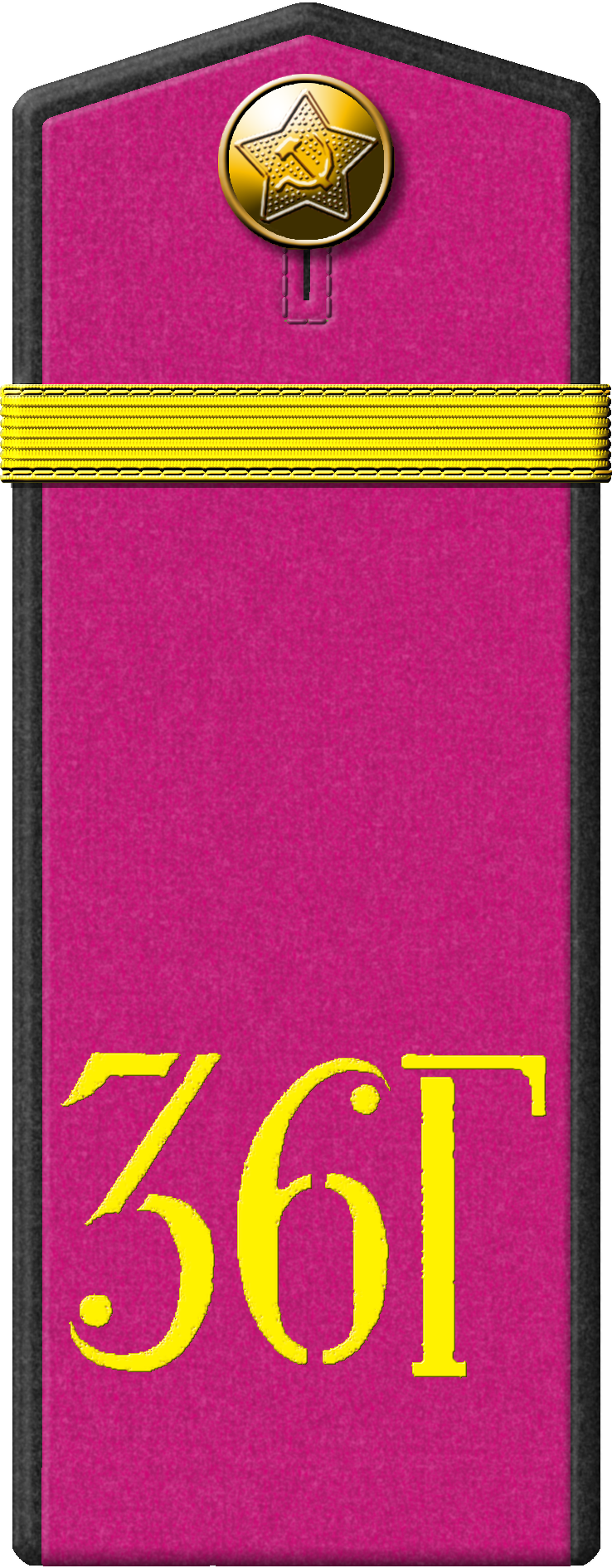
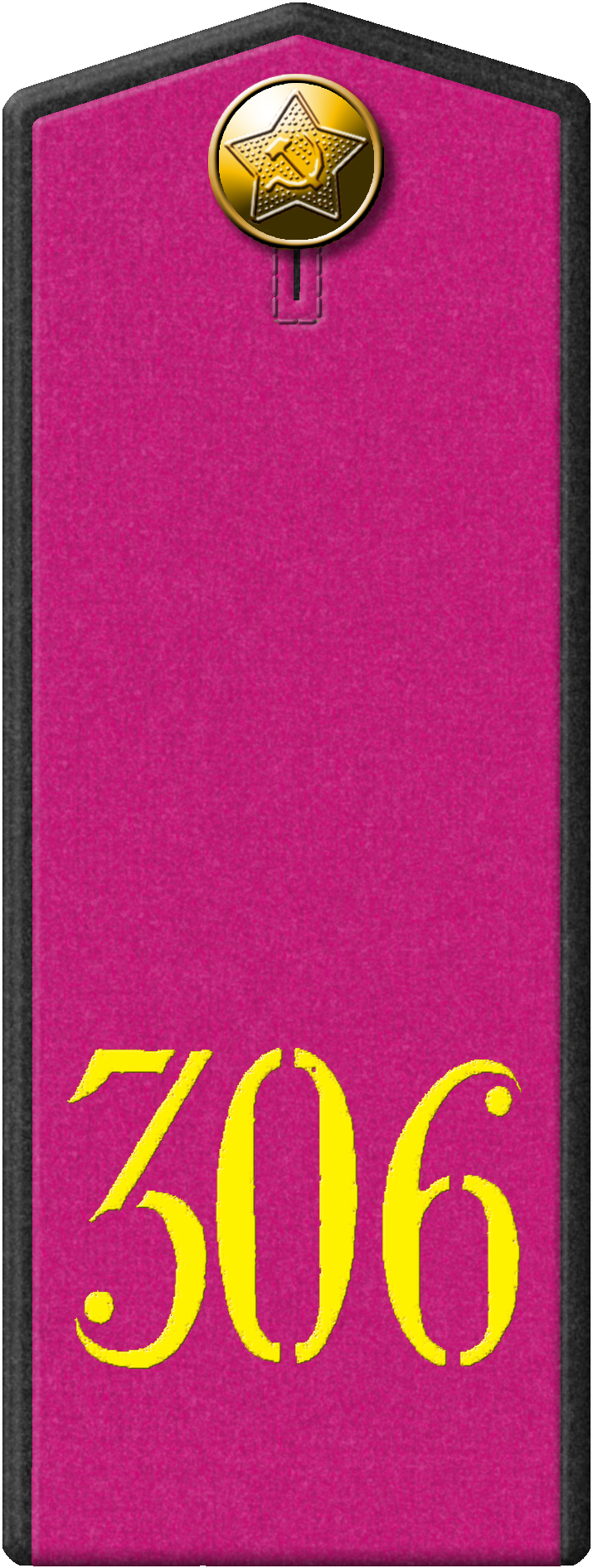
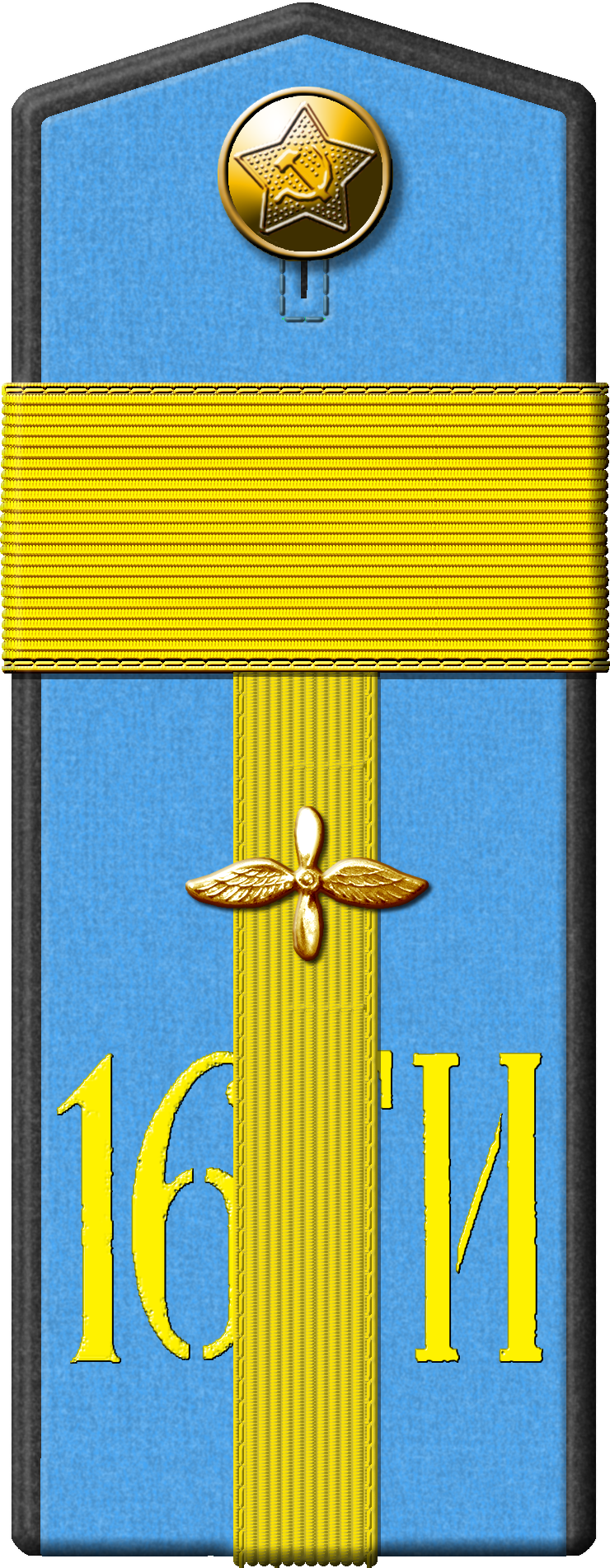
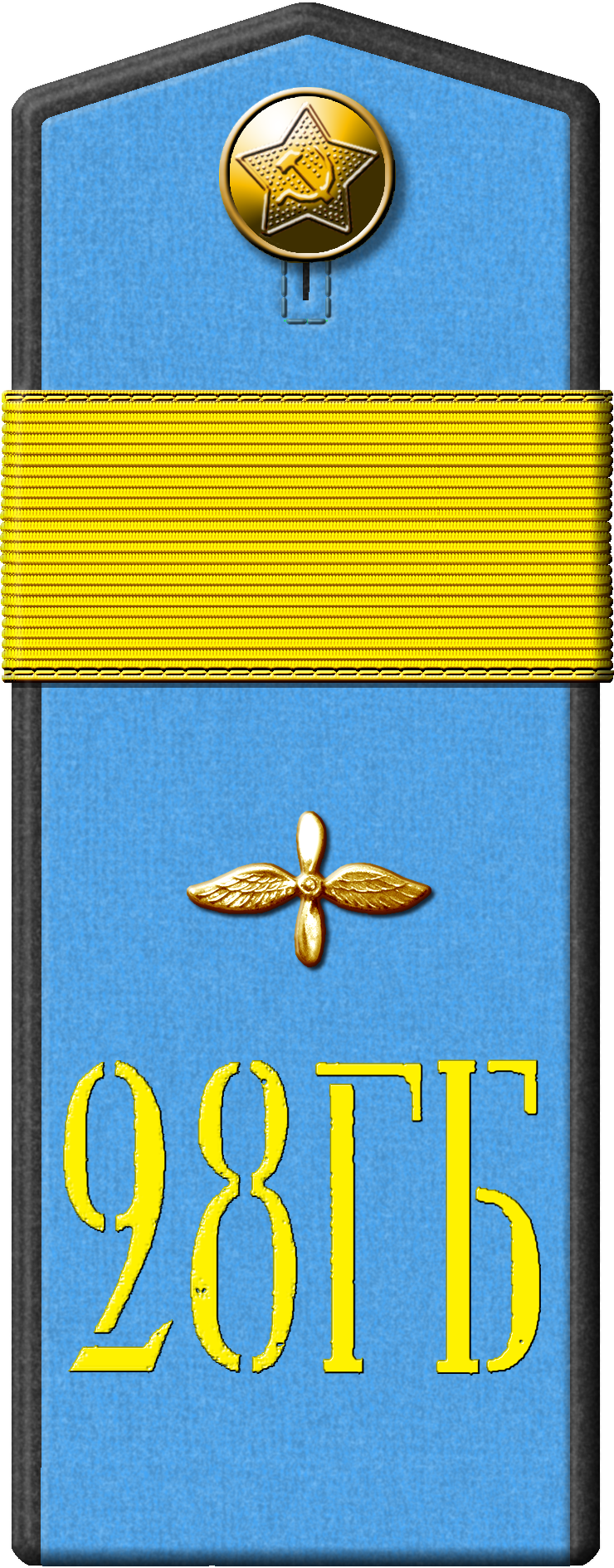
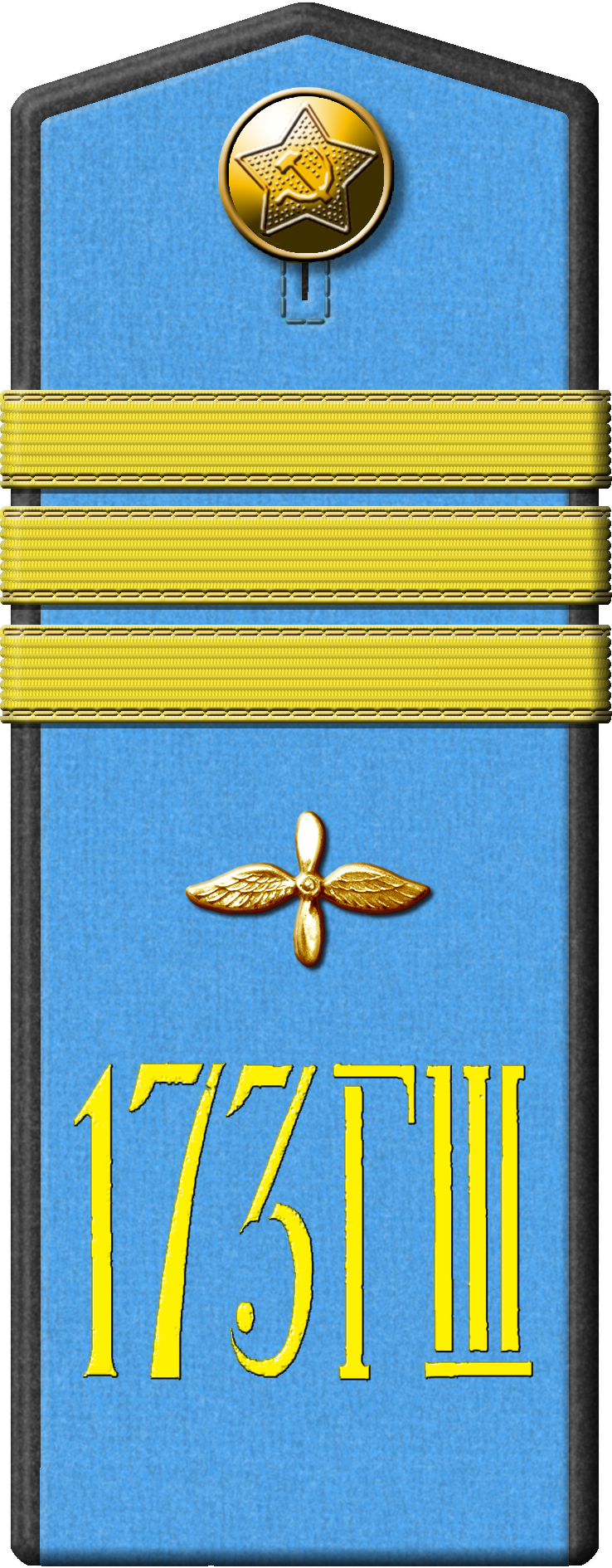
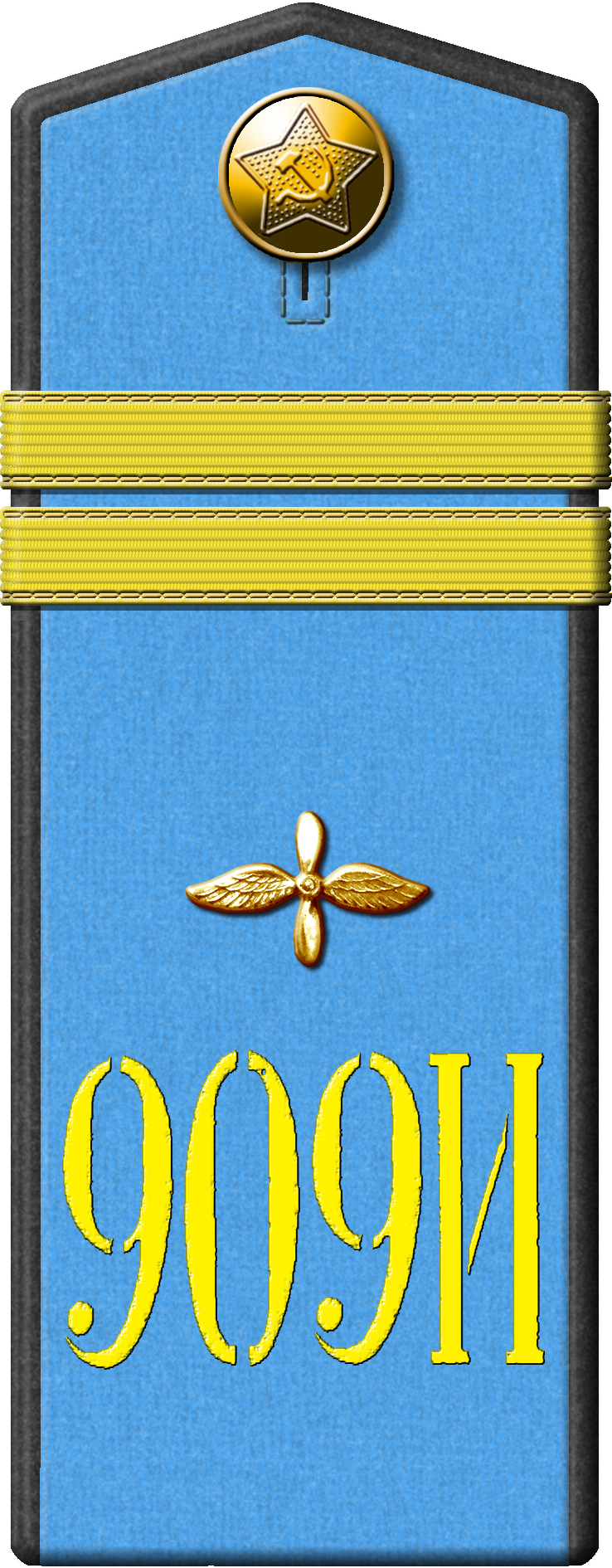
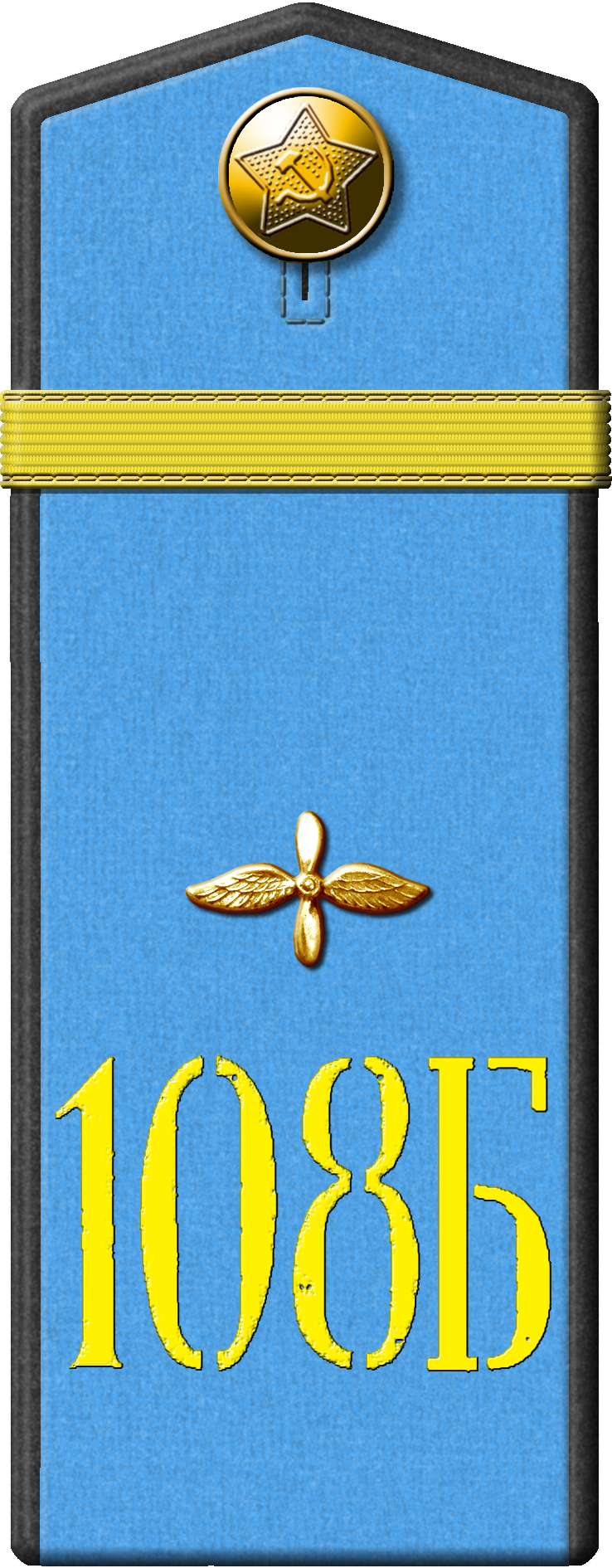
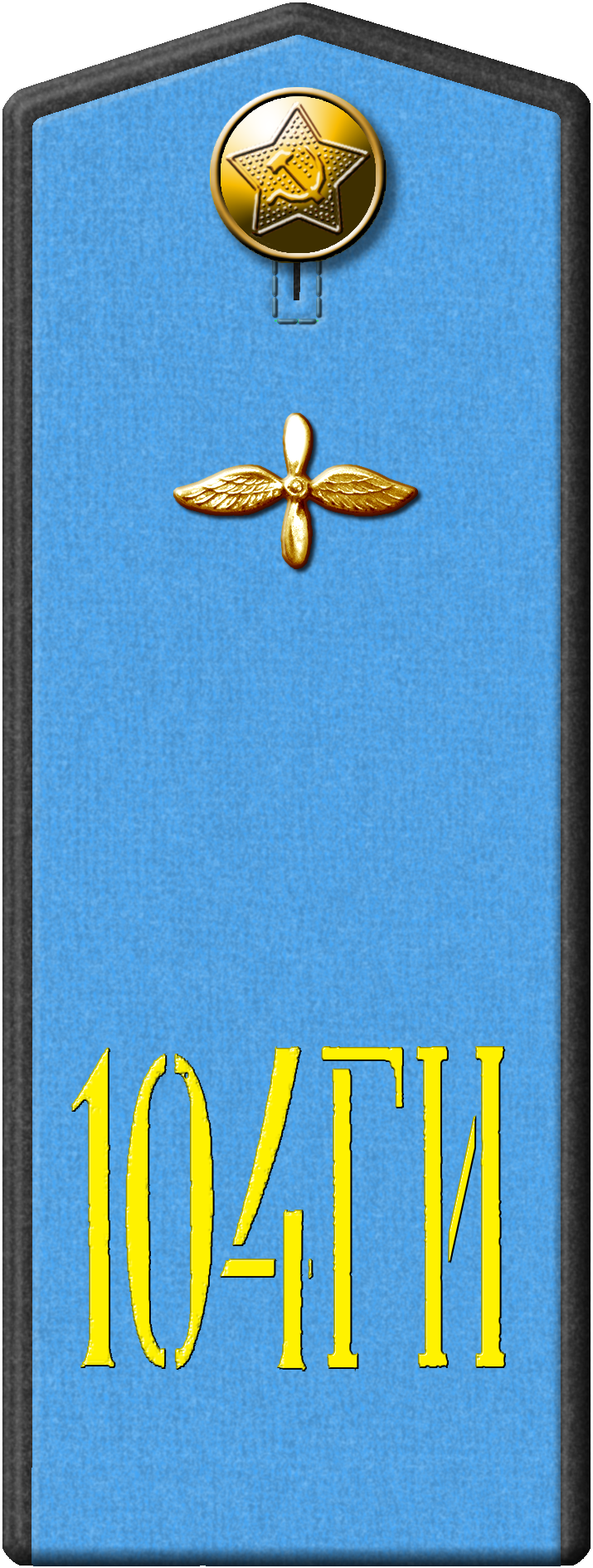
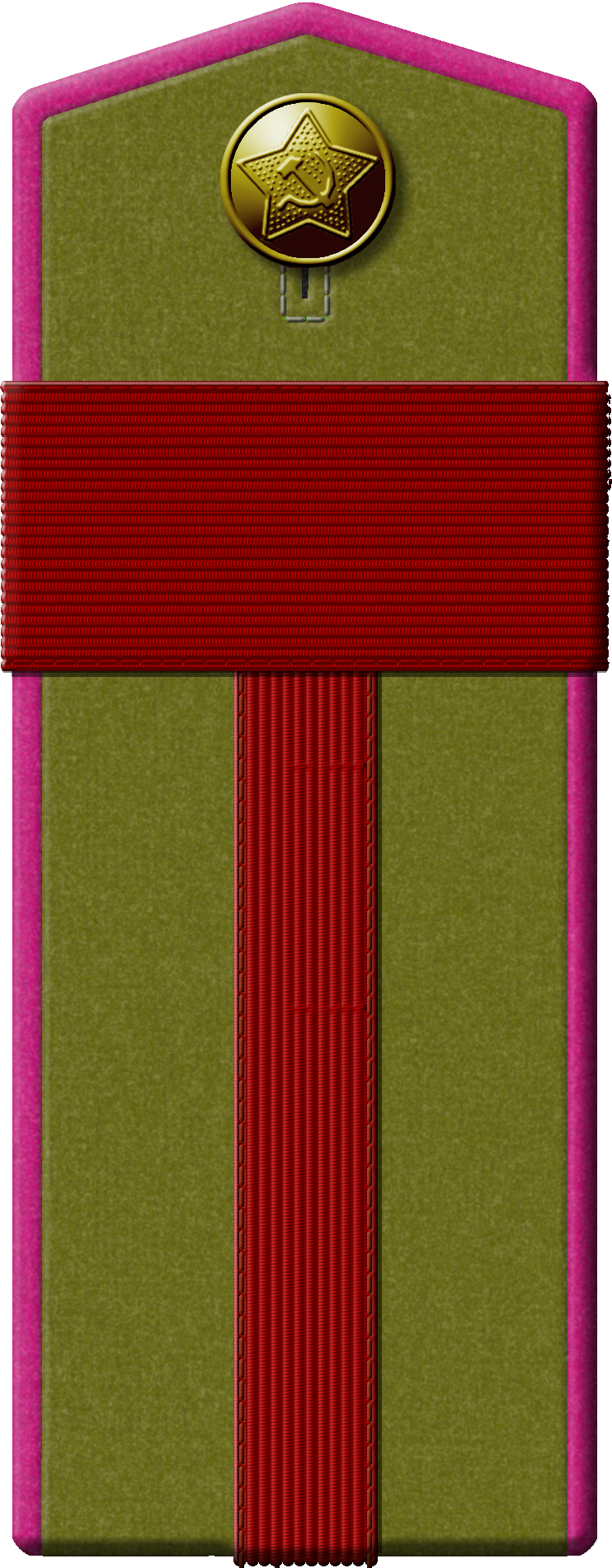
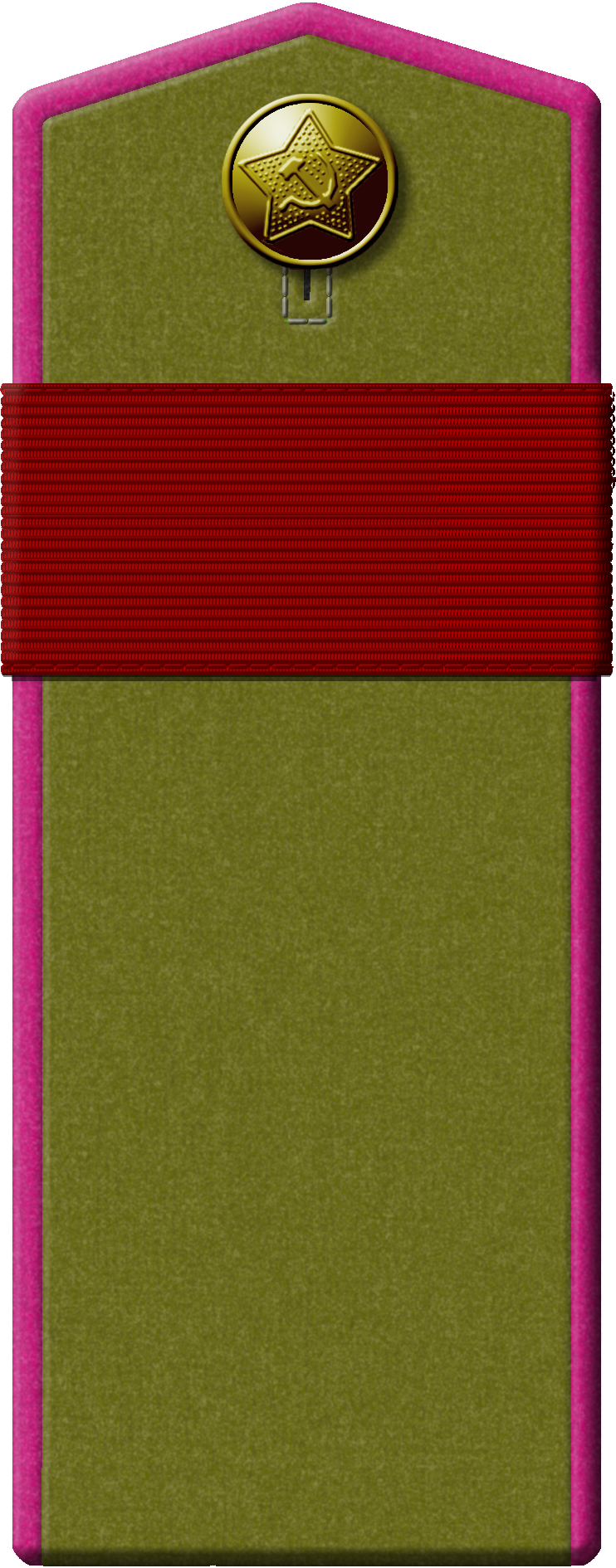
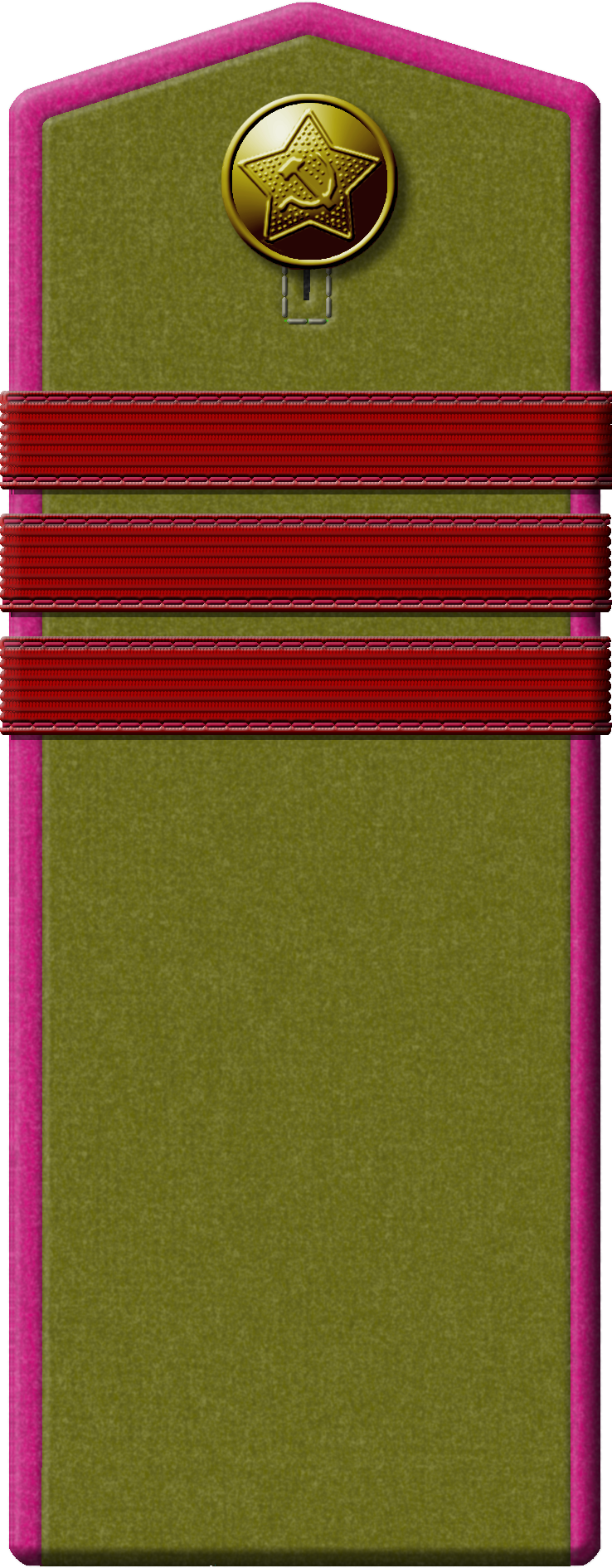
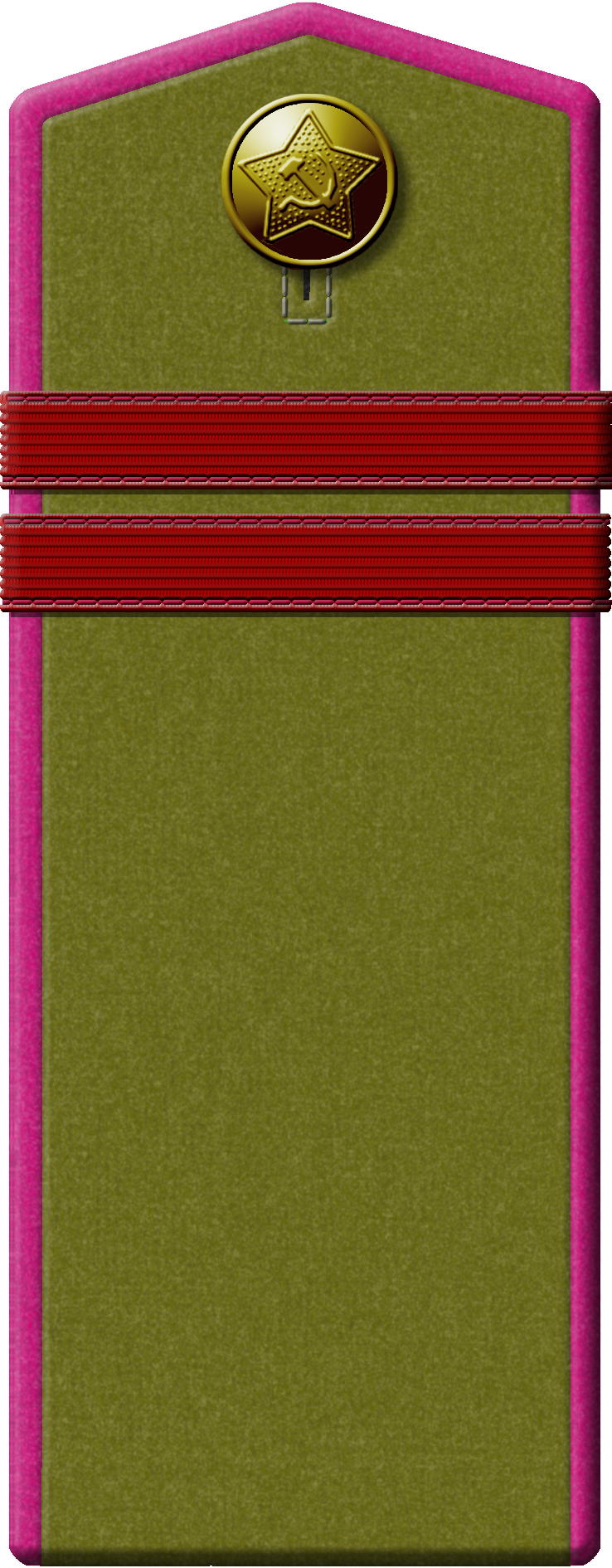
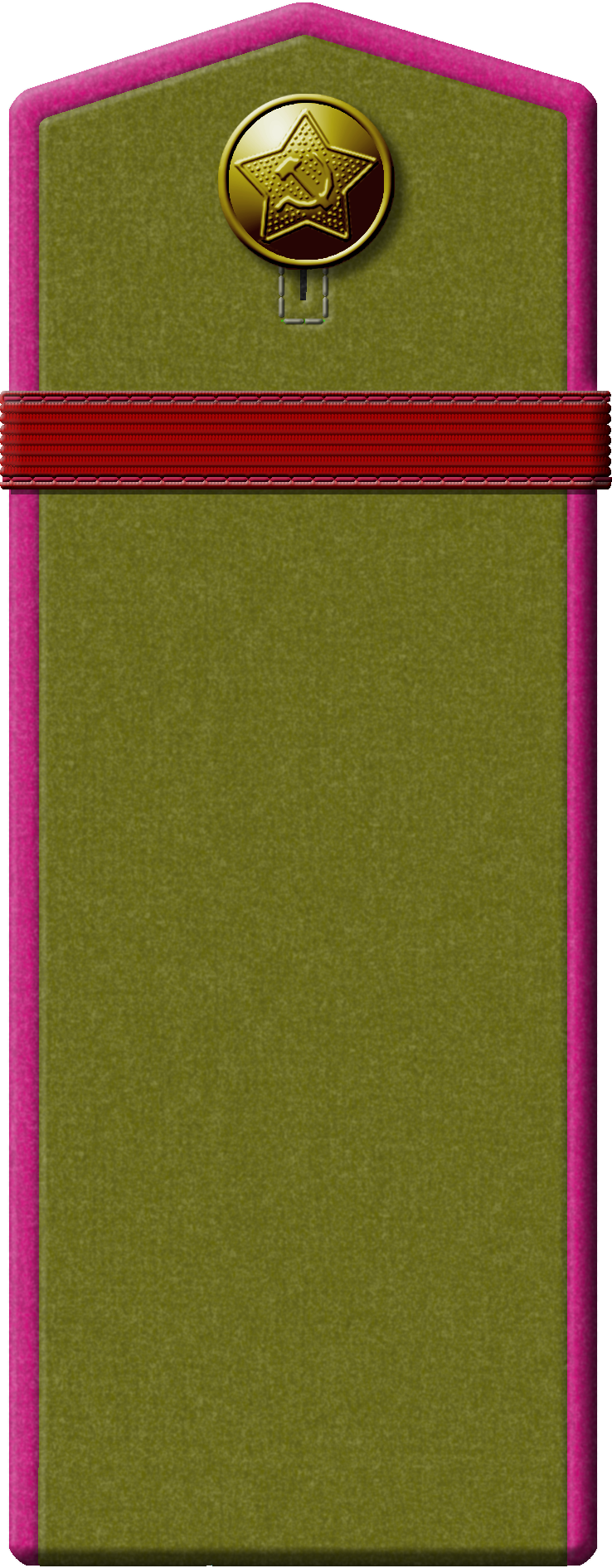
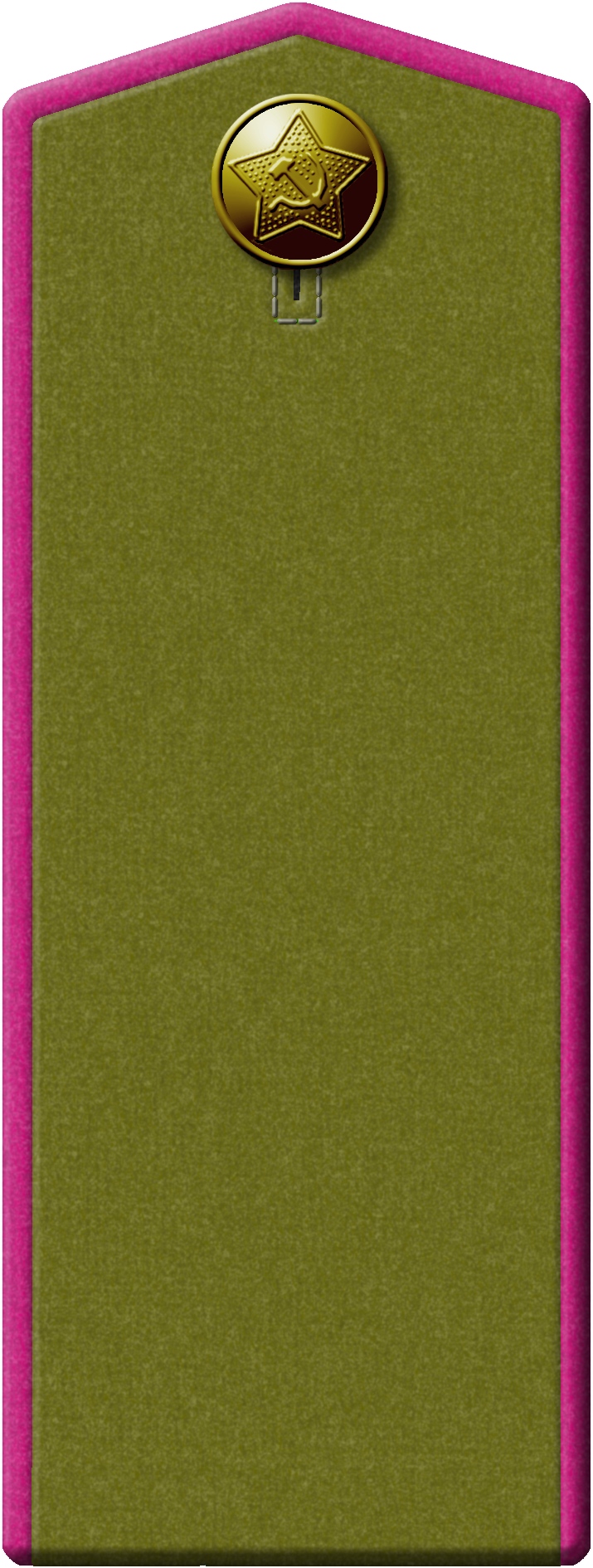
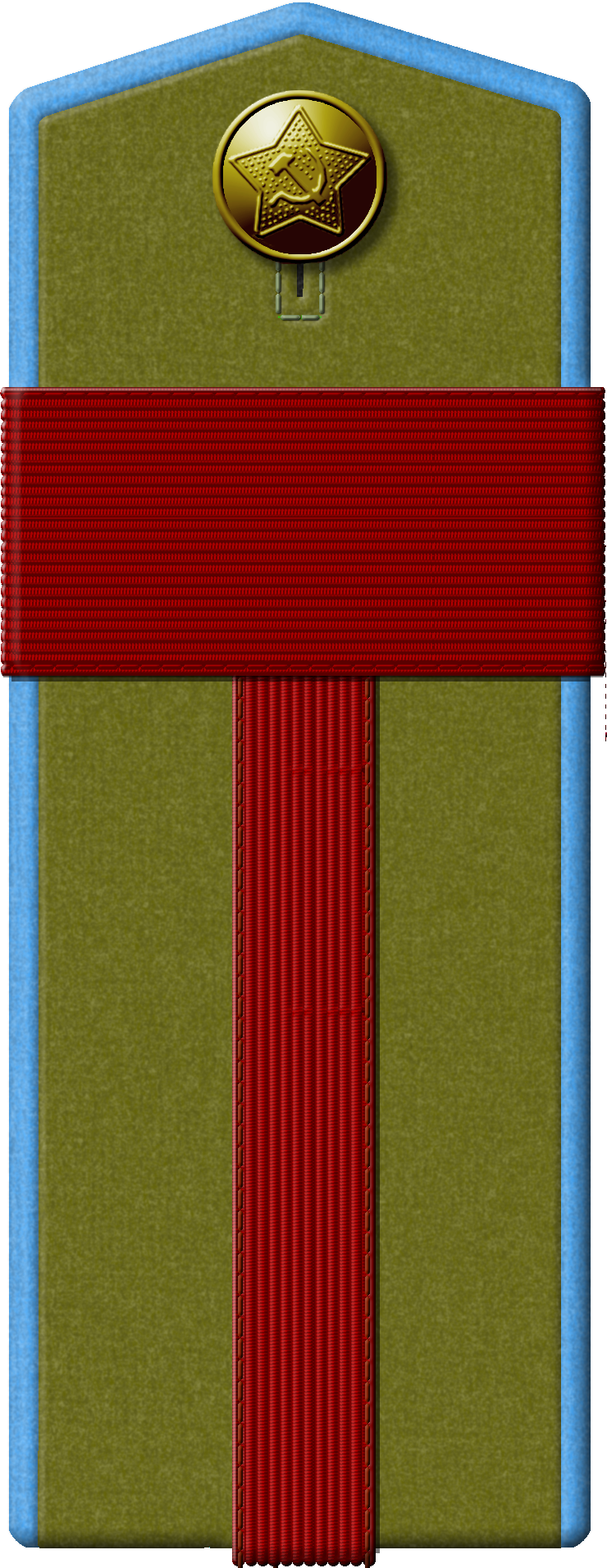
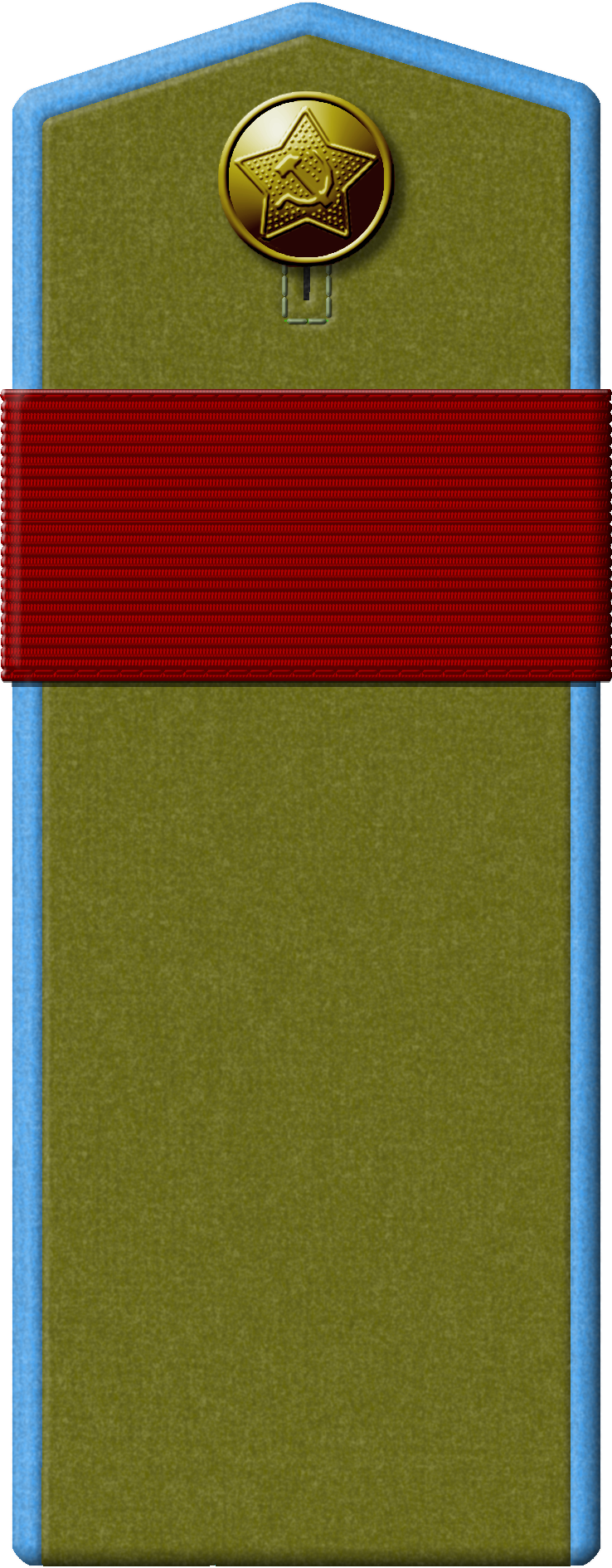
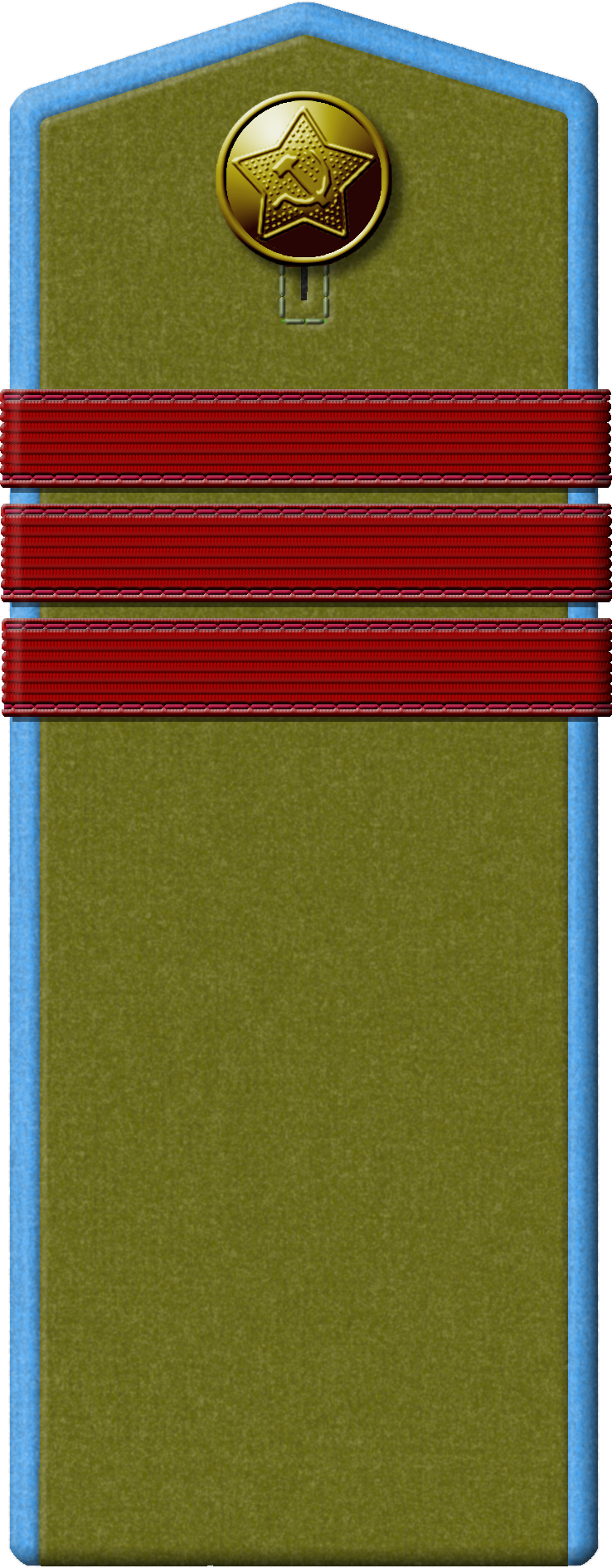
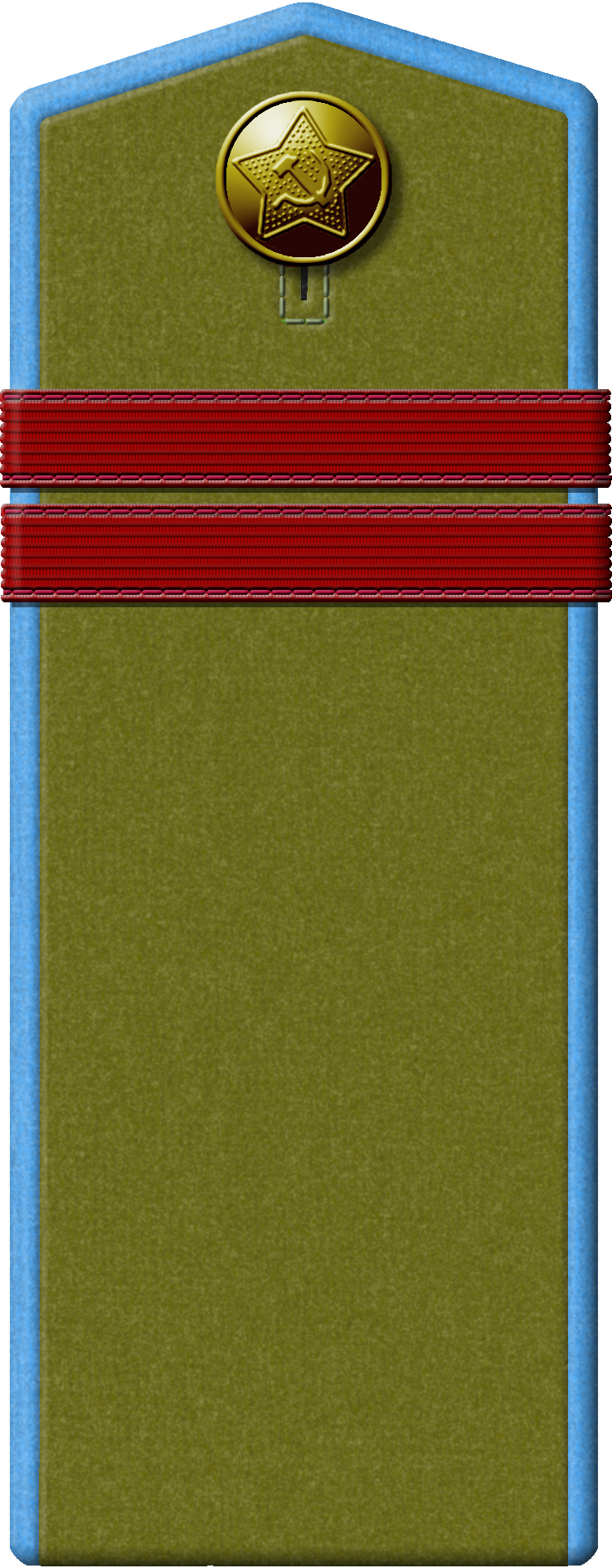
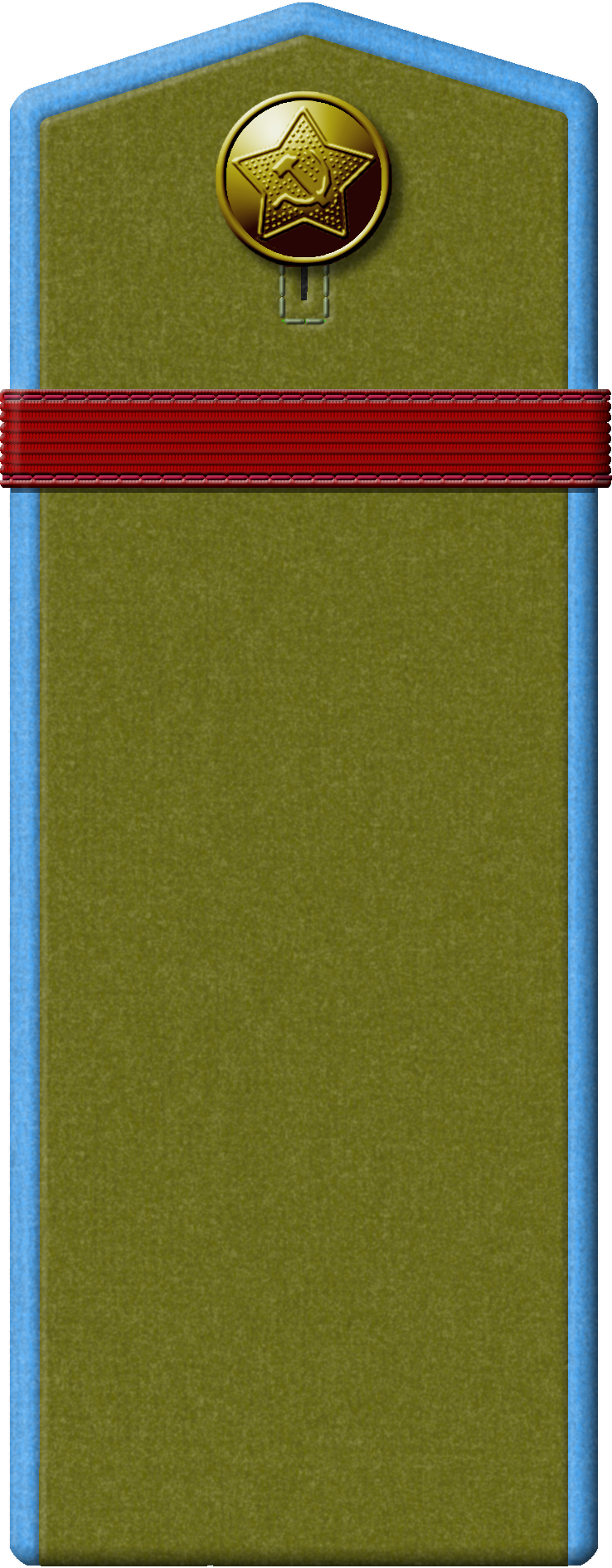
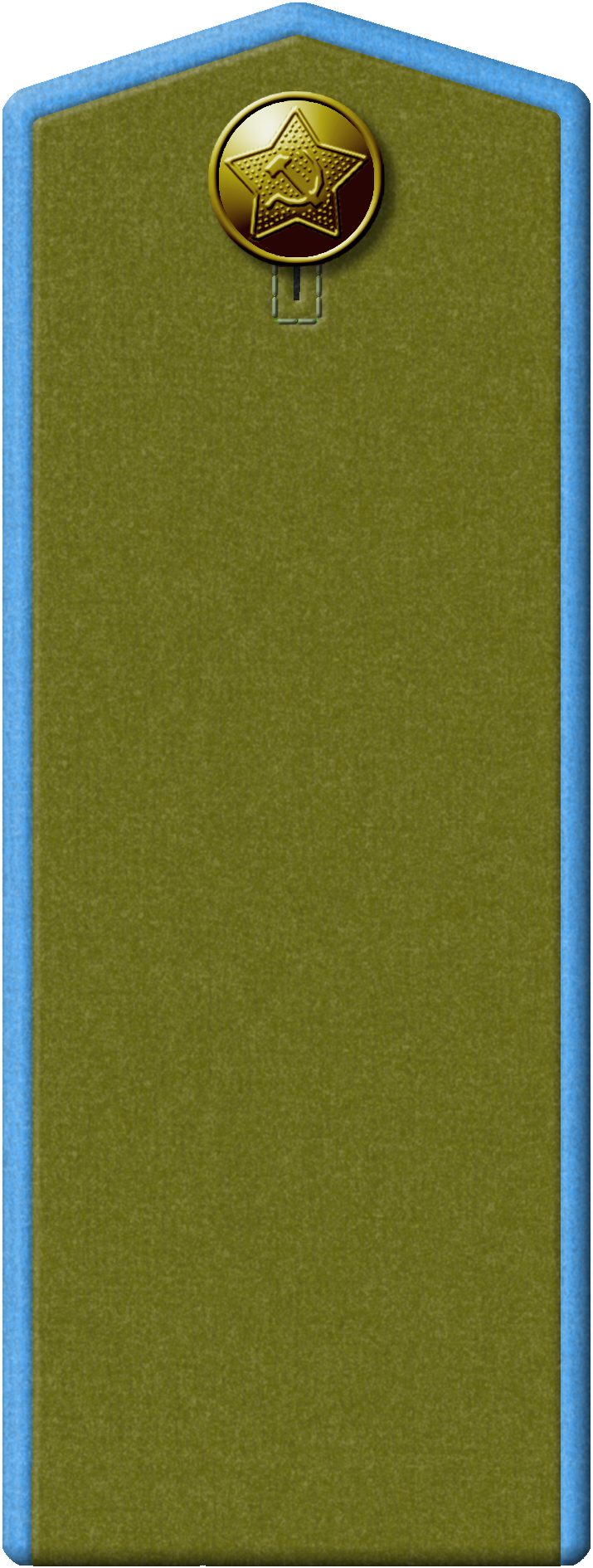
Rank group	Senior NCOs				Junior NCOs	Enlisted
Parade uniform
Army
Air force
Field uniform
Army
Air force
	Старшина́ Starshyná	Ста́рший сержа́нт Stárshiy serzhánt	Сержа́нт; Serzhánt	Мла́дший сержа́нт Mládshiy serzhánt	Ефре́йтор; Efréĭtor	красноармеец (Before 1946); Krasnoarmeyets; Рядово́й (After 1946); Ryadovóy
Translation	Sergeant major	Senior sergeant	Sergeant	Junior sergeant	Corporal	Red Army man Private

==== Variations ====
Field and service uniform as shown for Senior sergeant.

Insignia	Artillery	Armoured Troops	Cavalry	Chemical Troops	Electrical Troops
Rank	4th Guards Artillery Regiment	8th Guards Tank, Order of the Red Banner, Order of Suvorov Brigade			
Insignia	Engineer Troops	Medical Corps	Motor-Car Units	Pontoon Corps	Railway Troops, Military Communications
Rank			5th Guards Motorcycle Regiment		
Insignia	Road Troops	Sapper Troops	Signal Troops	Survey Troops	Veterinary Corps
Rank					

=== Officers ===
==== Marshals of the branch ====
The rank of Army general was only awarded to officers of the army from the infantry branch directly, all other branches and services were promoted to the ranks of marshal and chief marshal of the branch (equivalents, respectively, to the ranks of Army general and Marshal of the Soviet Union).

Rank	Chief marshal of the branch				
Service uniform					
Field uniform					
Rank designation	Главный маршал артиллерии Glavnyy marshal artillerii	Главный маршал авиации Glavnyy marshal aviatsii	Главный маршал бронетанковых войск Glavnyy marshal bronetankovykh voysk	Главный маршал войск связи Glavnyy marshal voysk svyazi	Главный маршал инженерных войск Glavnyy marshal inzhenernykh voysk
Translation	Chief marshal of artillery	Chief marshal of aviation	Chief marshal of the armoured troops	Chief marshal of the signal troops	Chief marshal of the engineer troops
Rank	Marshal of the branch				
Service uniform	February–November 1943 since November 1943	February–November 1943 since November 1943	February–November 1943 since November 1943		
Field uniform	February–November 1943 1943	February–November 1943 1943	February–November 1943		
Rank designation	Маршал артиллерии Marshal artillerii	Маршал авиации Marshal aviatsii	Маршал бронетанковых войск Marshal bronetankovykh voysk	Маршал войск связи Marshal voysk svyazi	Маршал инженерных войск Marshal inzhenernykh voysk
Translation	Marshal of artillery	Marshal of aviation	Marshal of the armoured troops	Marshal of the signal troops	Marshal of the engineer troops

==== Commissioned officers ====
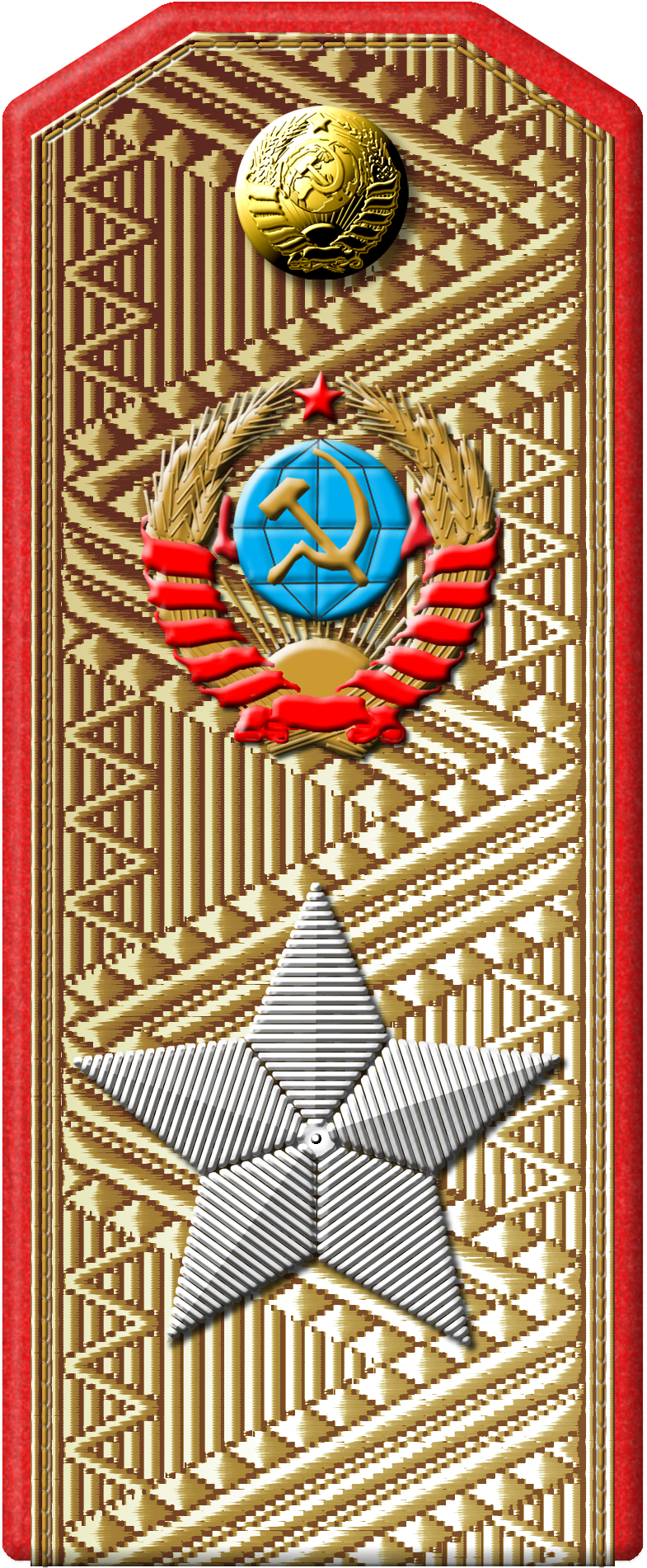
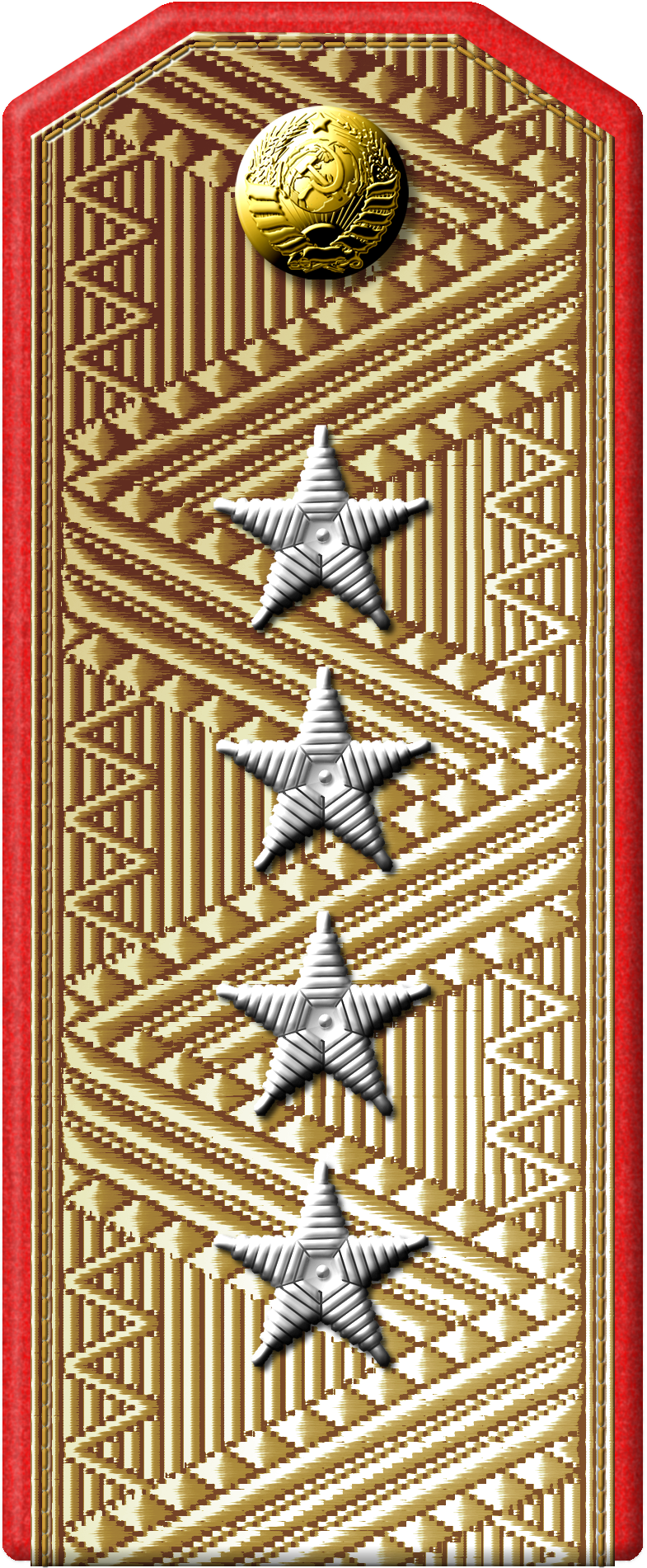
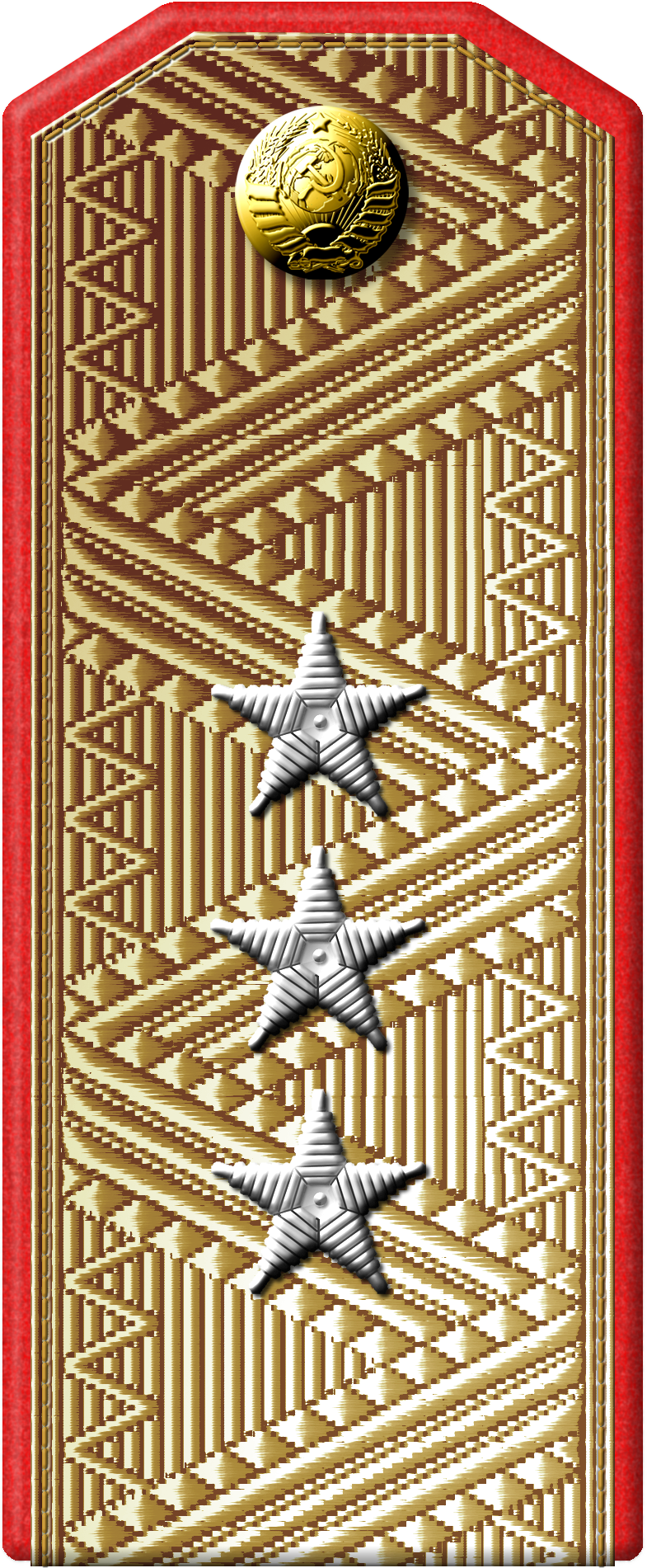
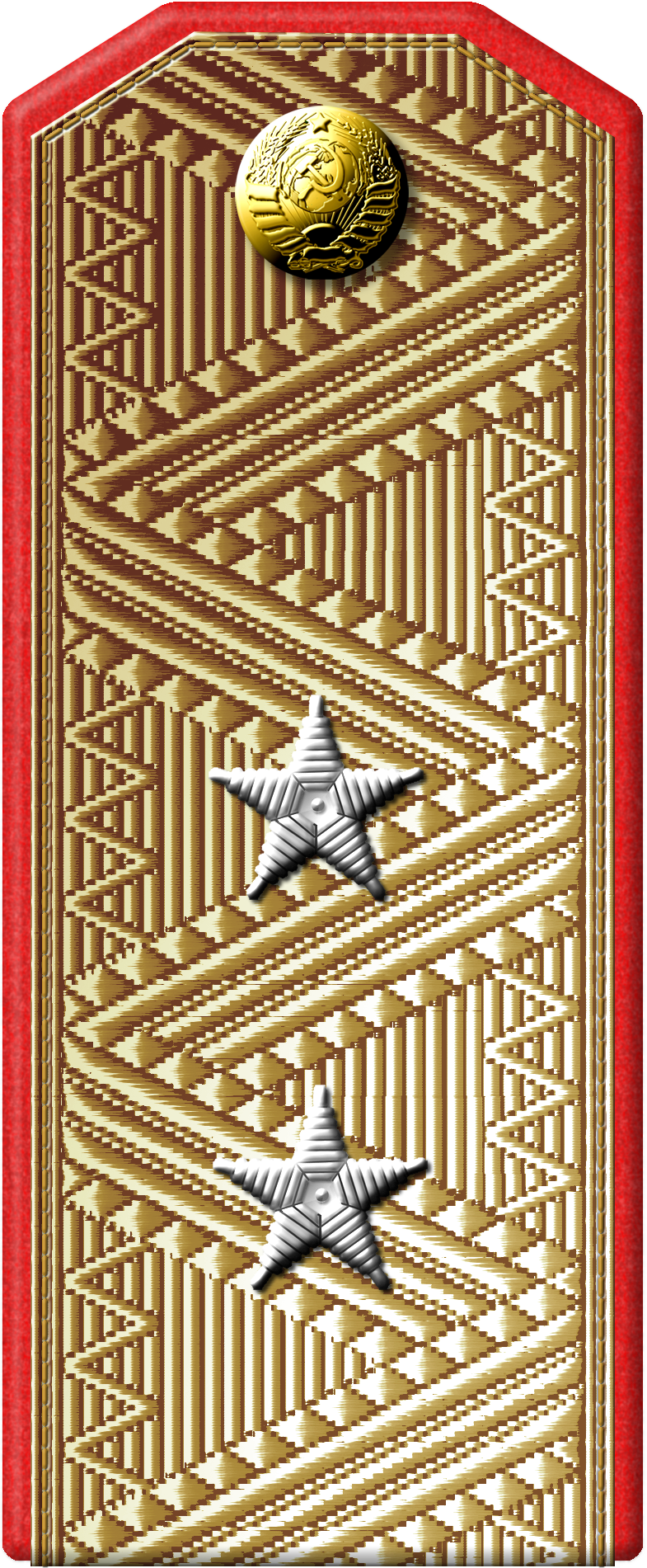
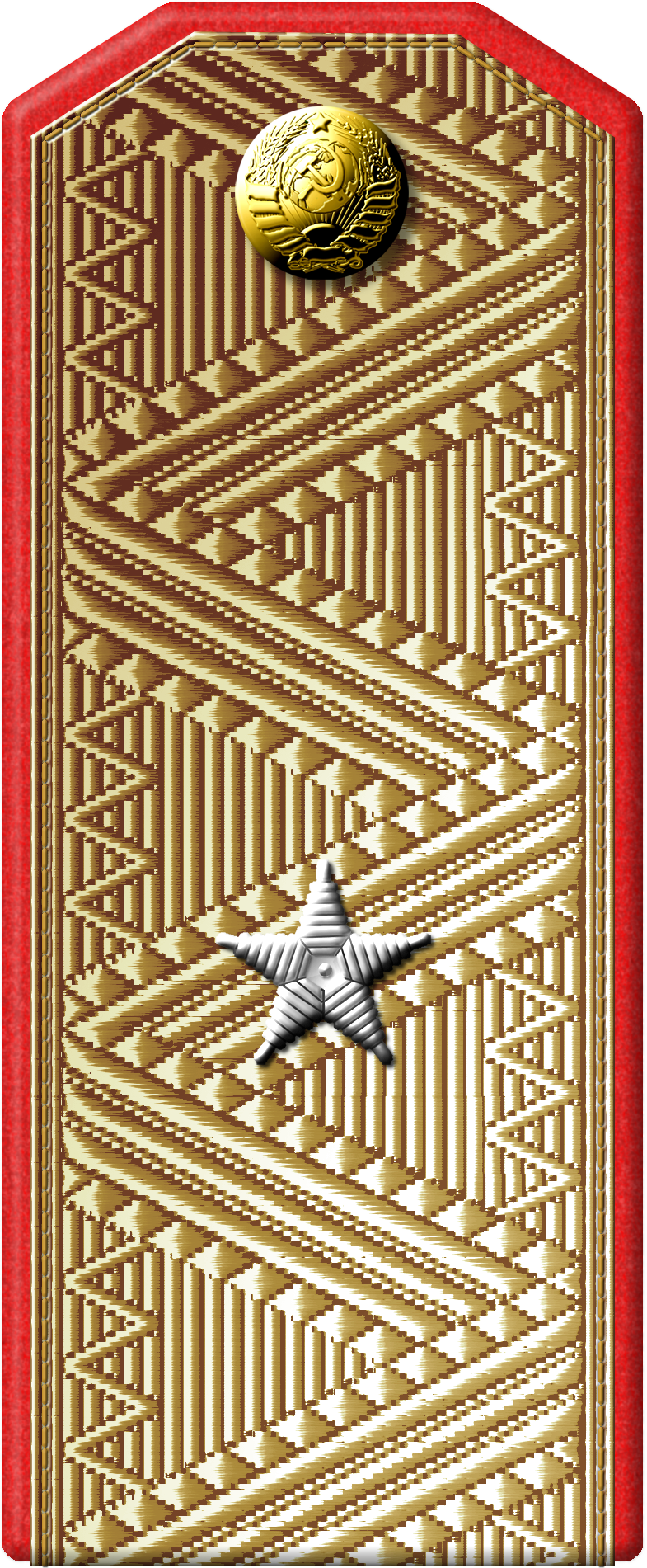
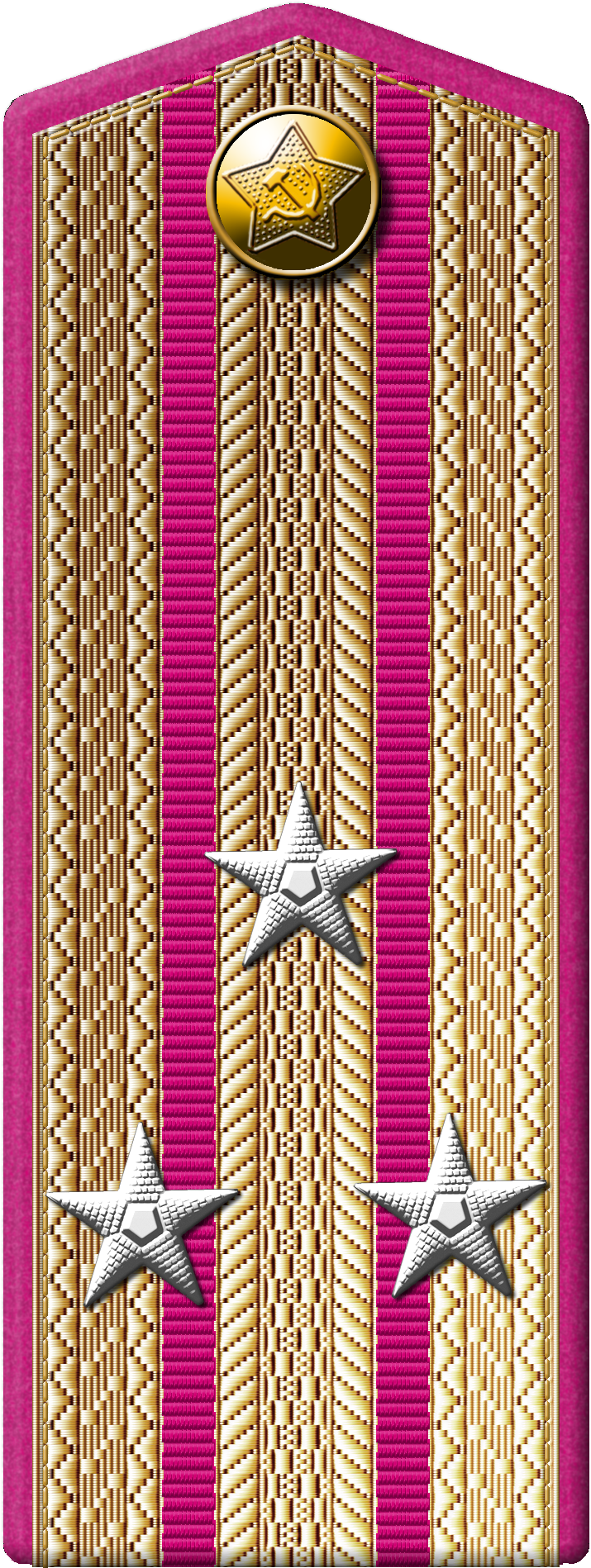
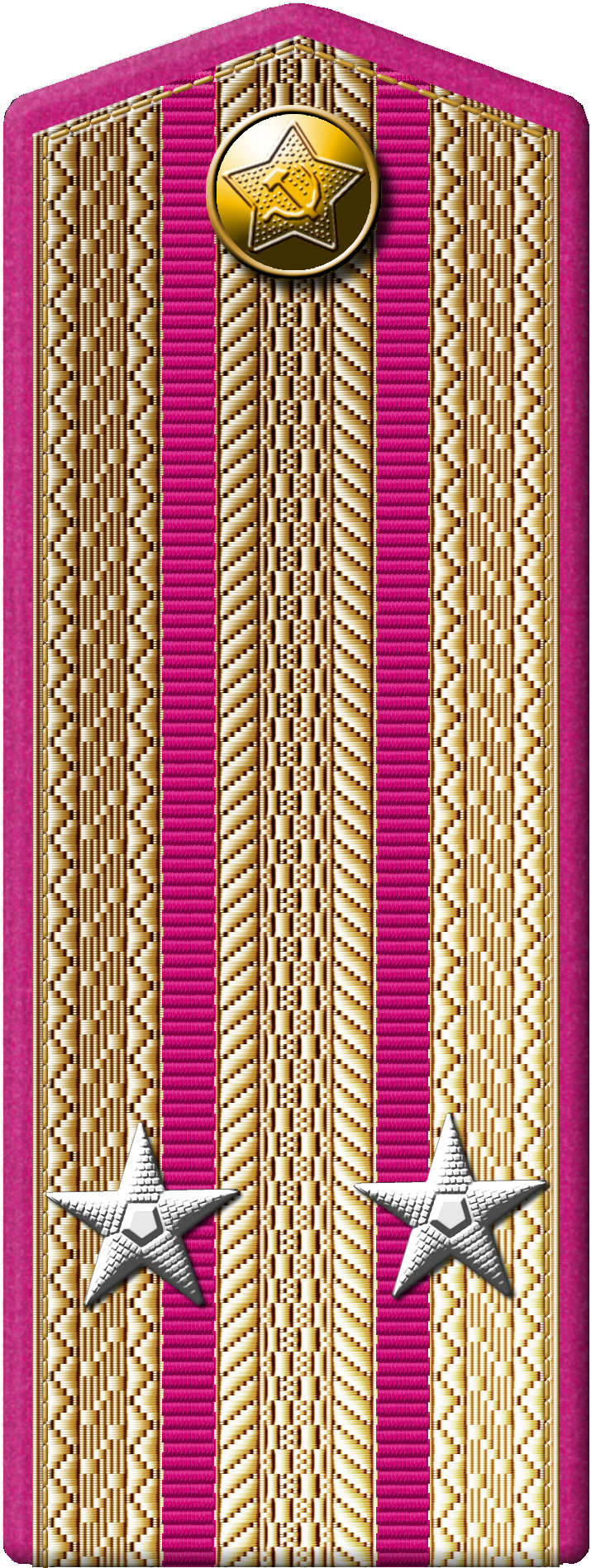
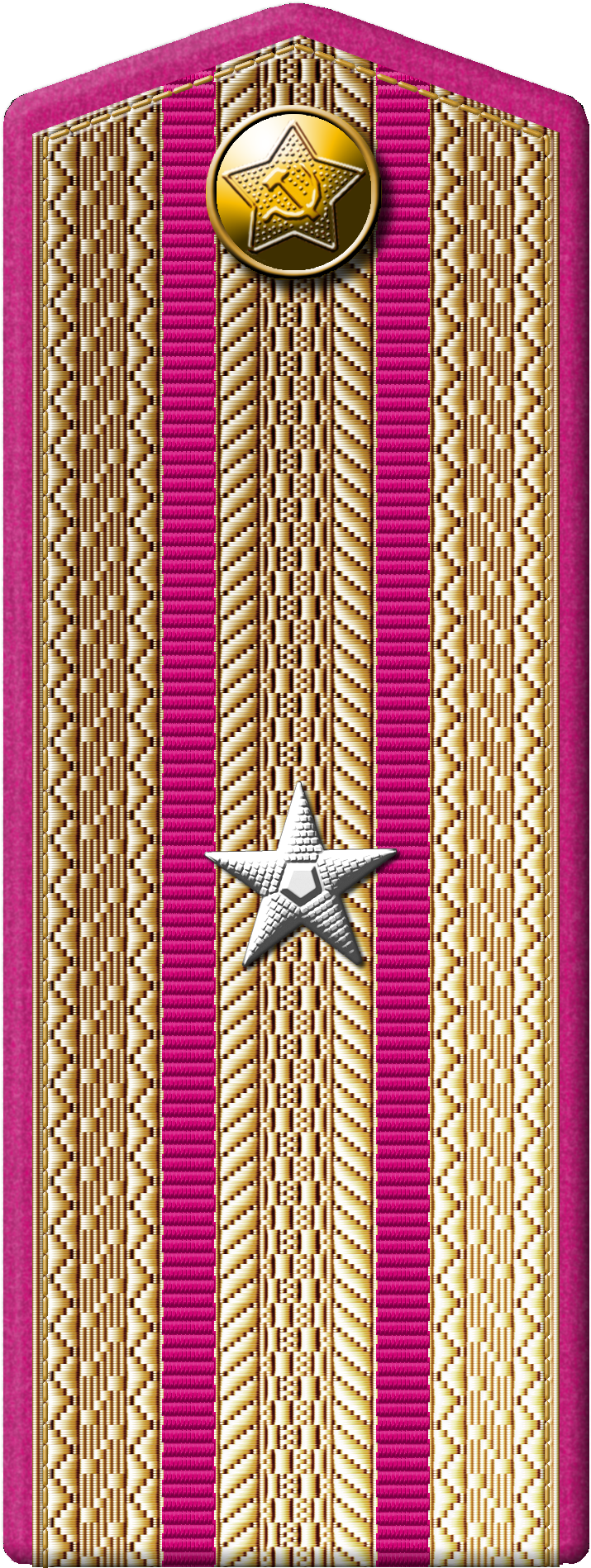
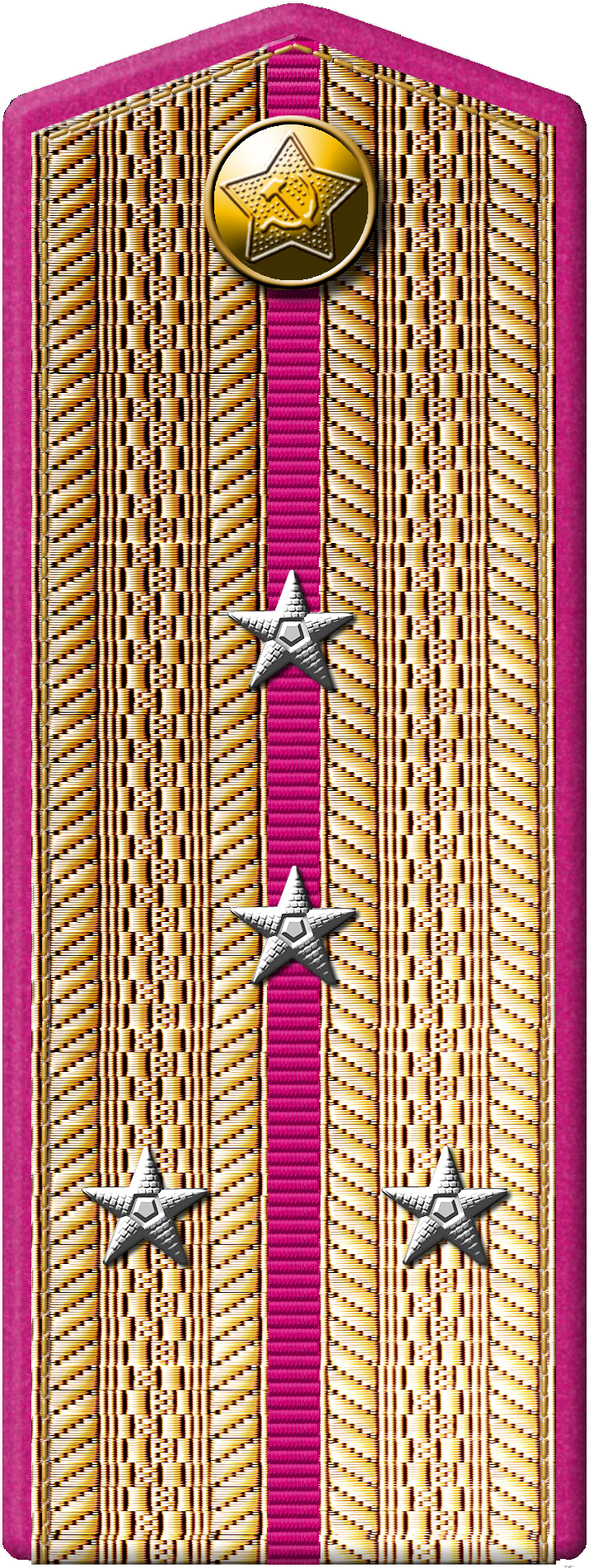
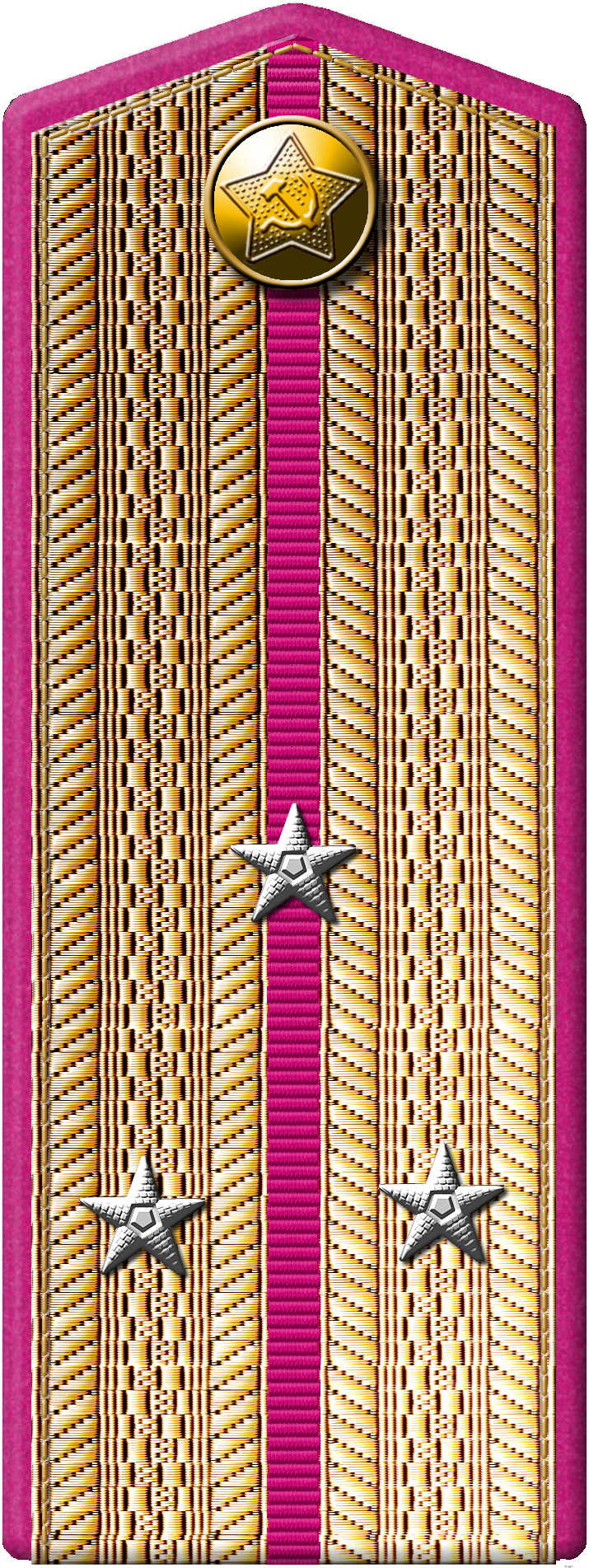
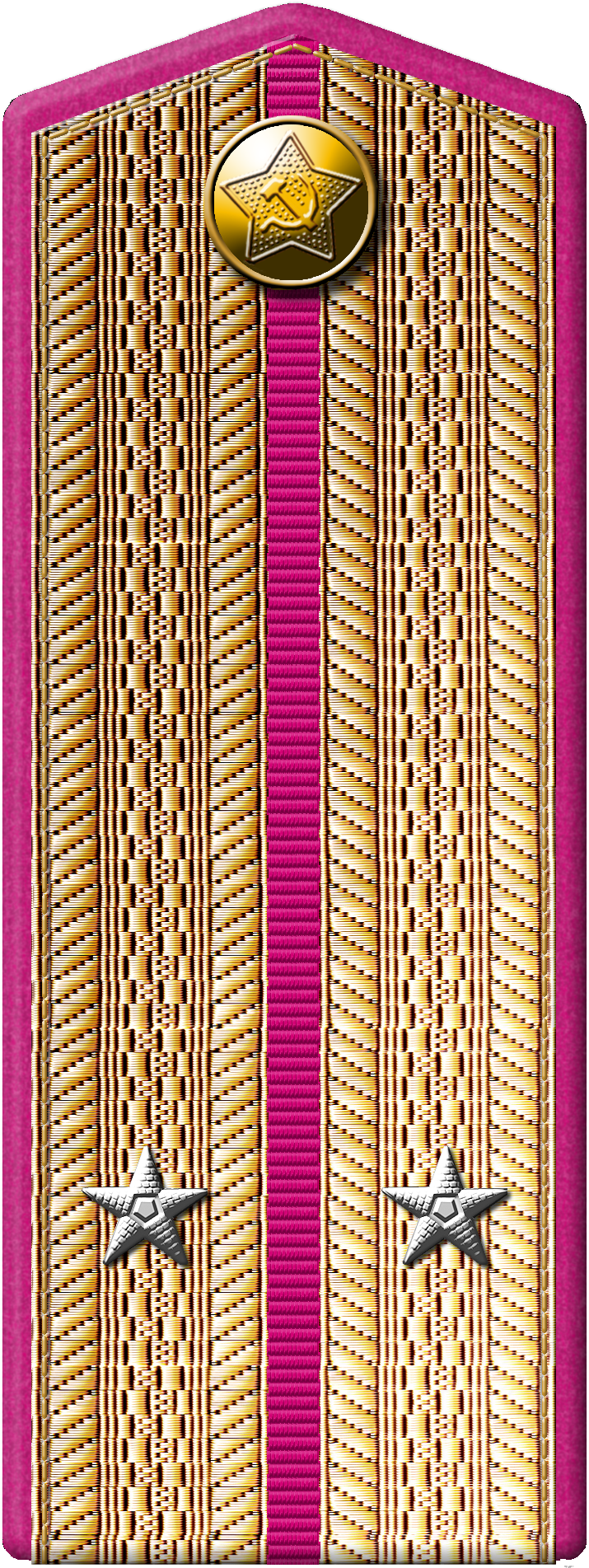
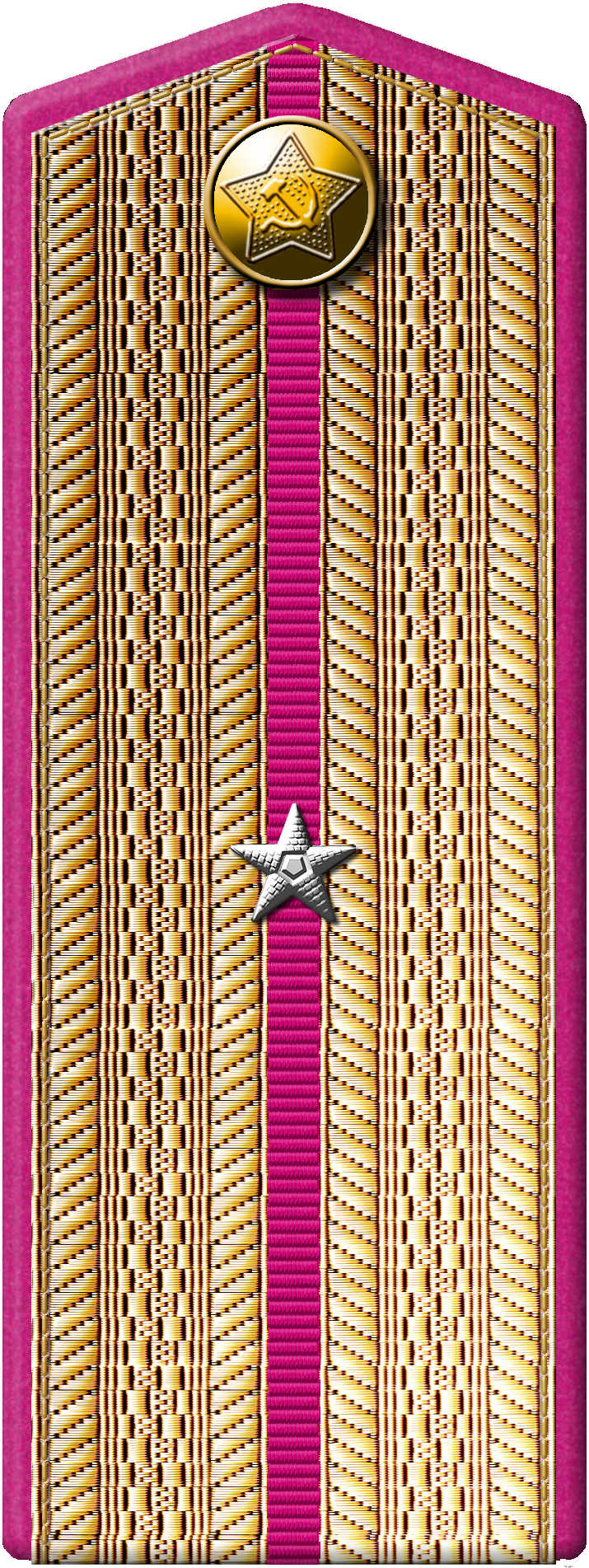
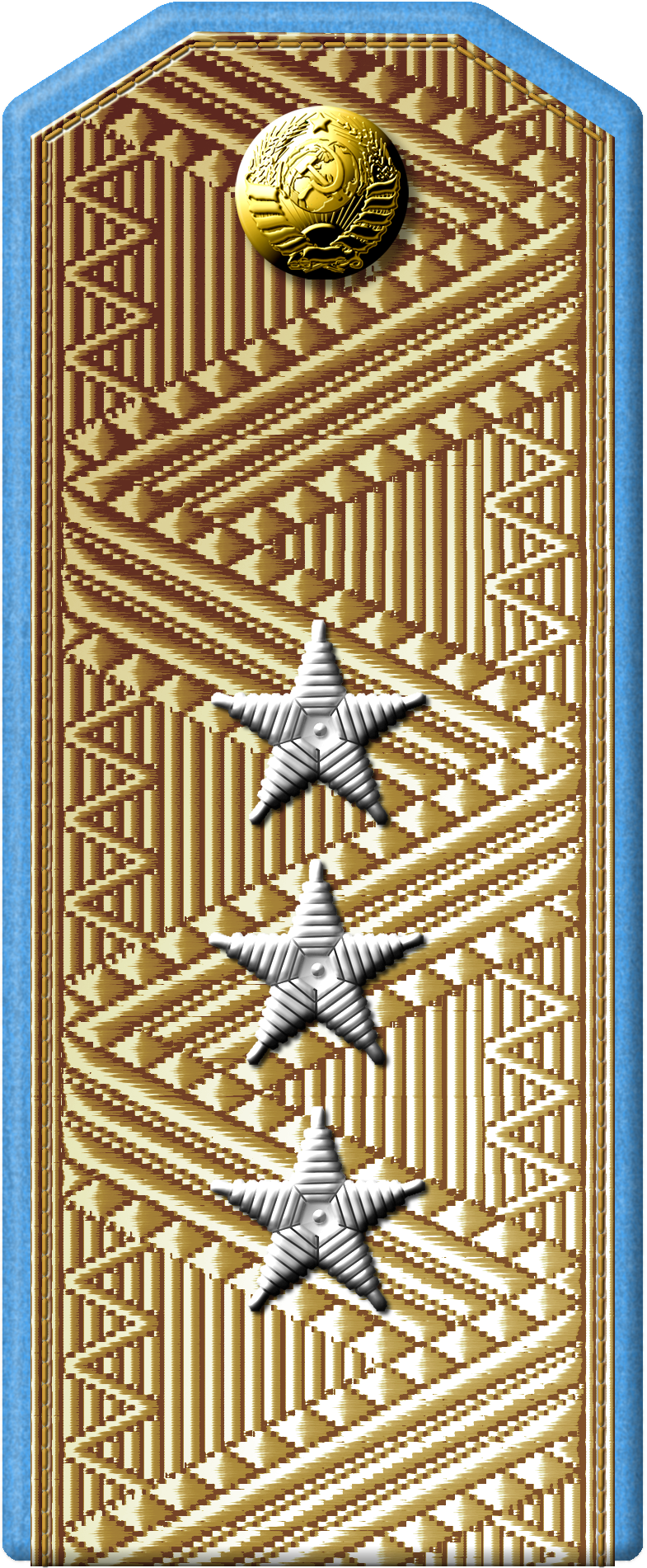
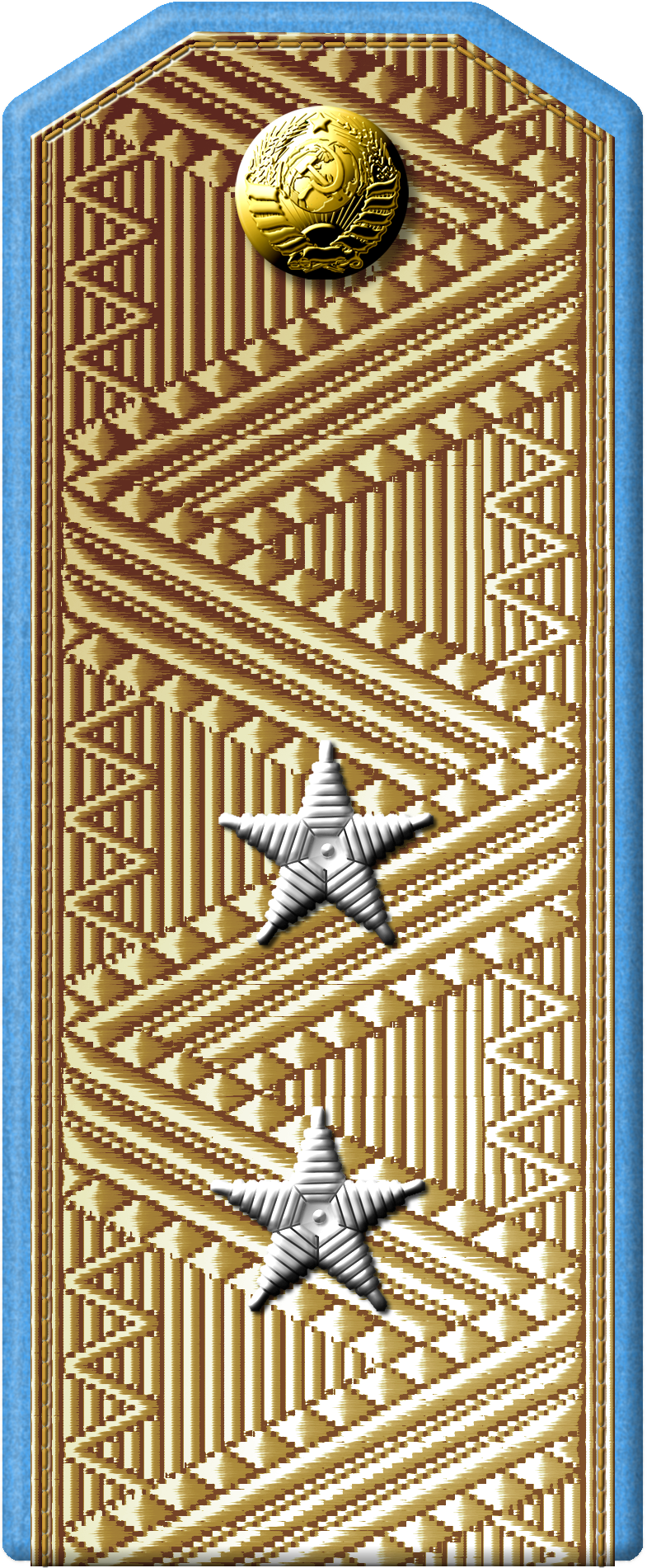
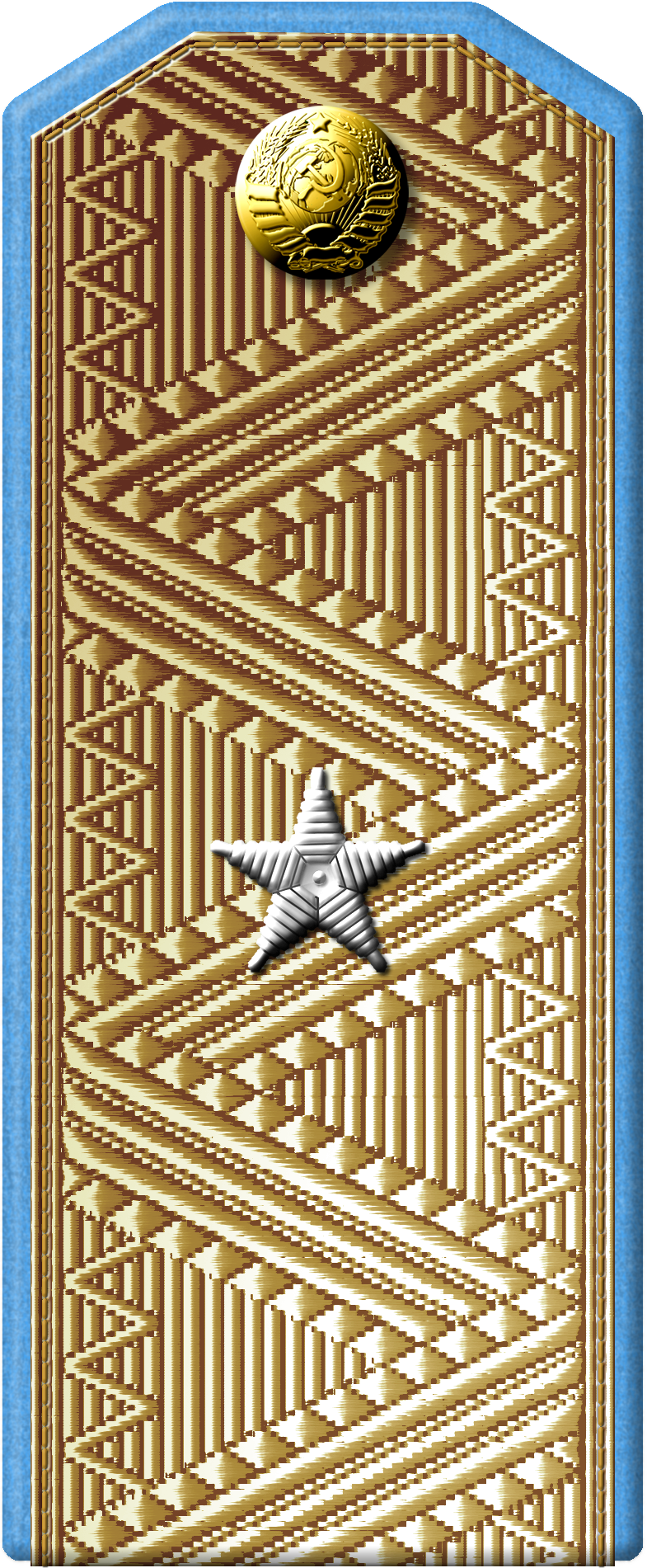
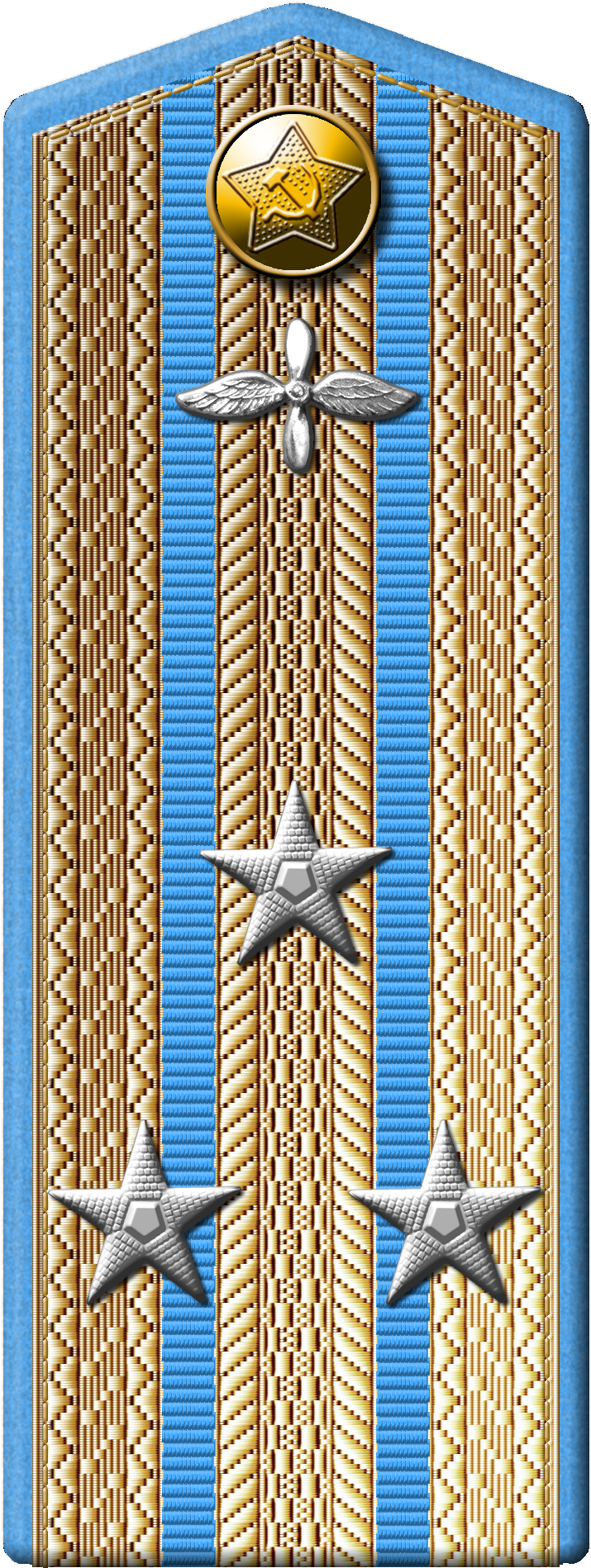
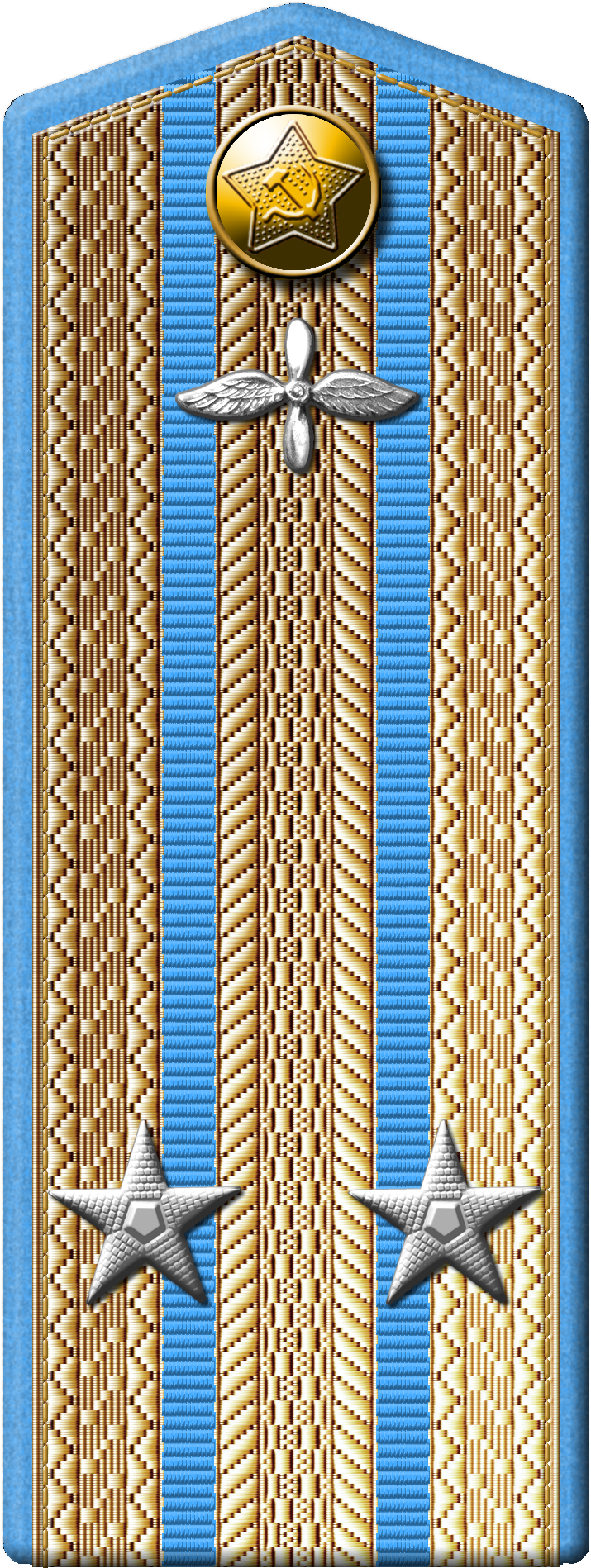
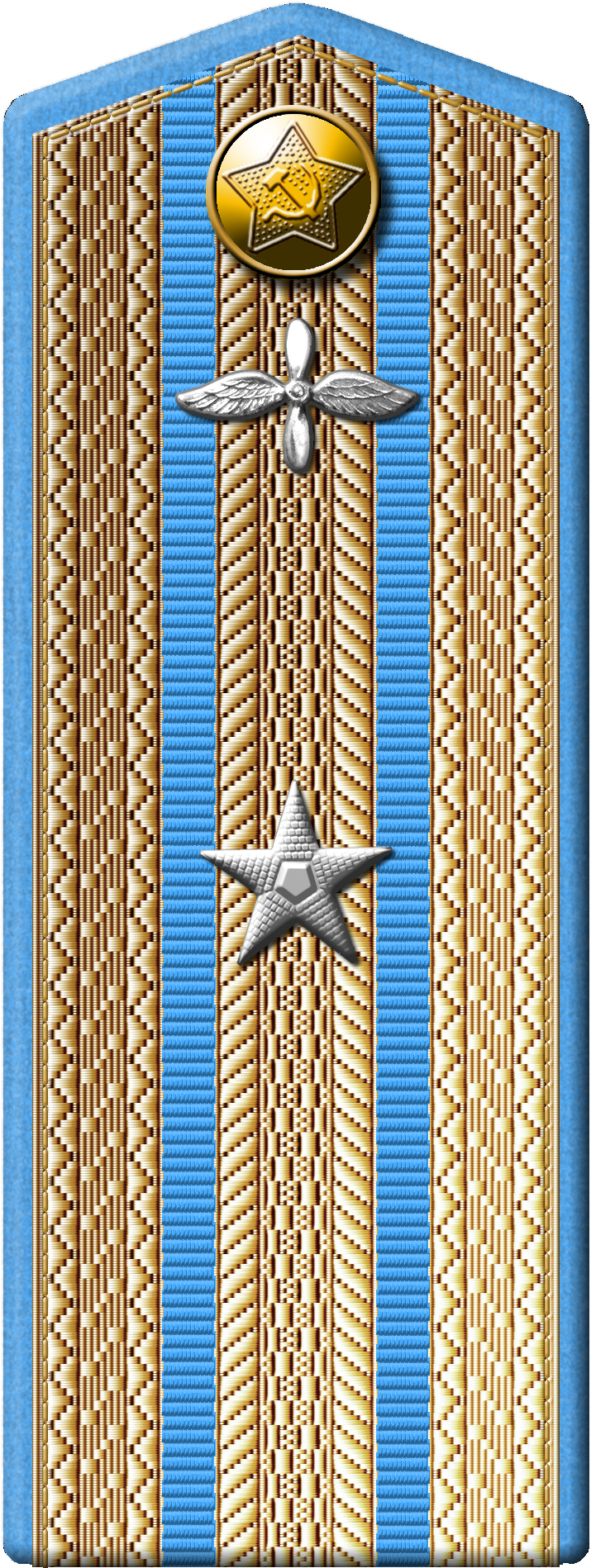
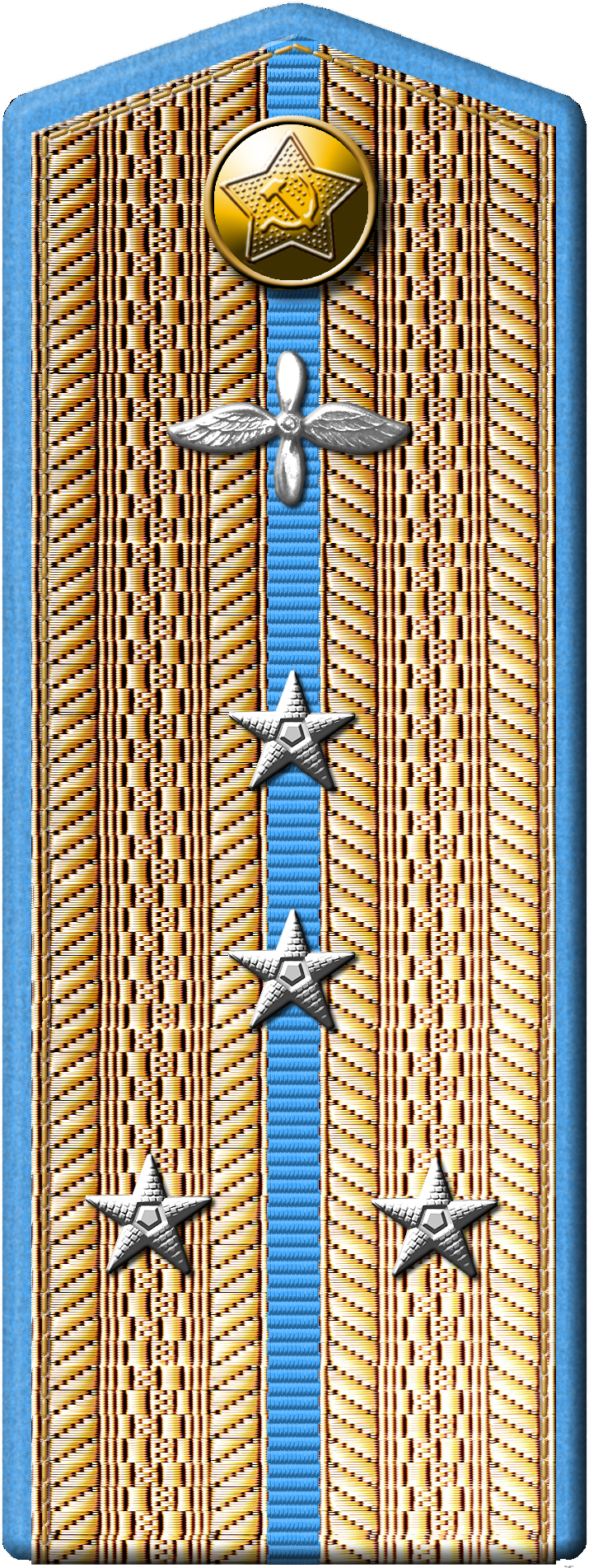
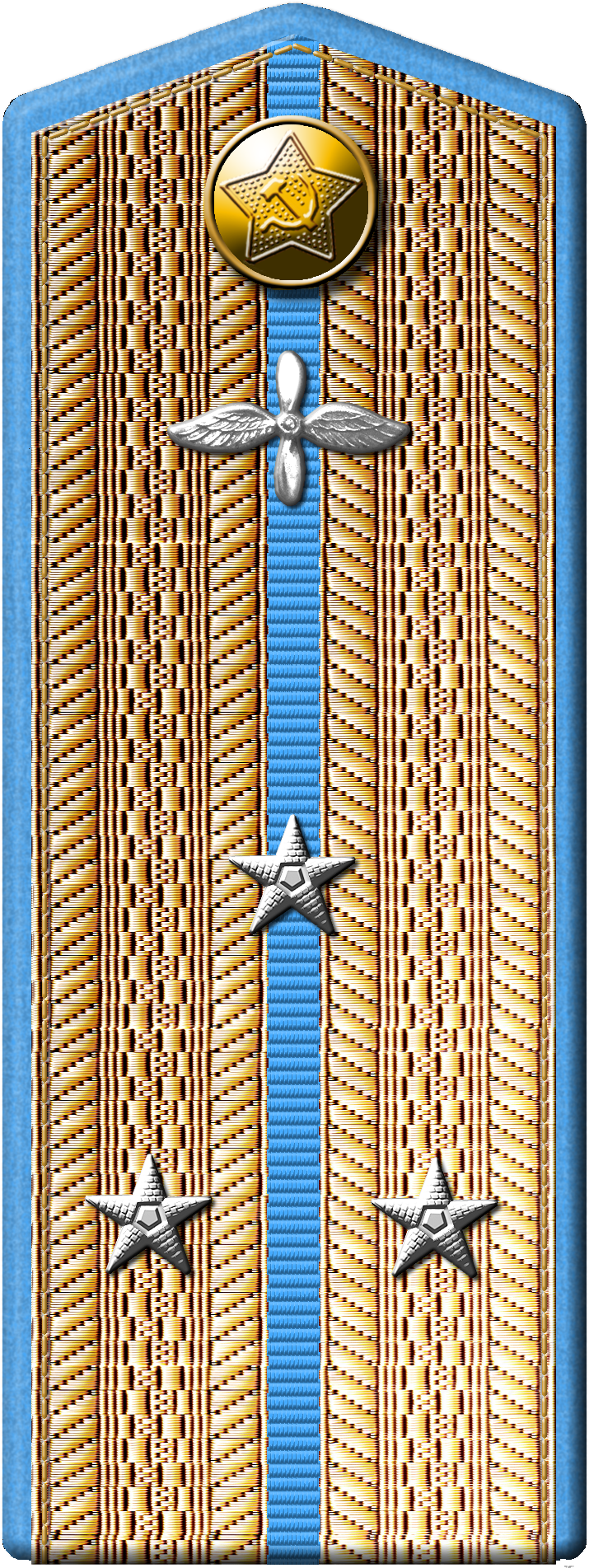
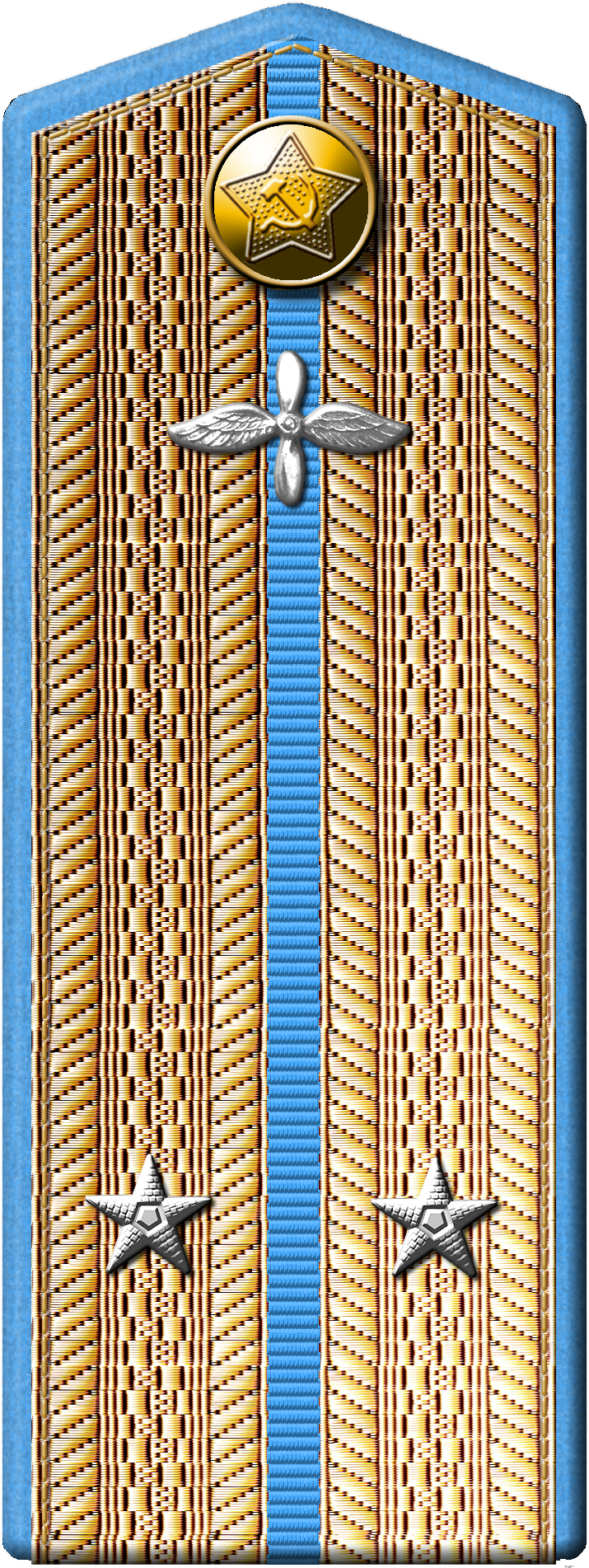
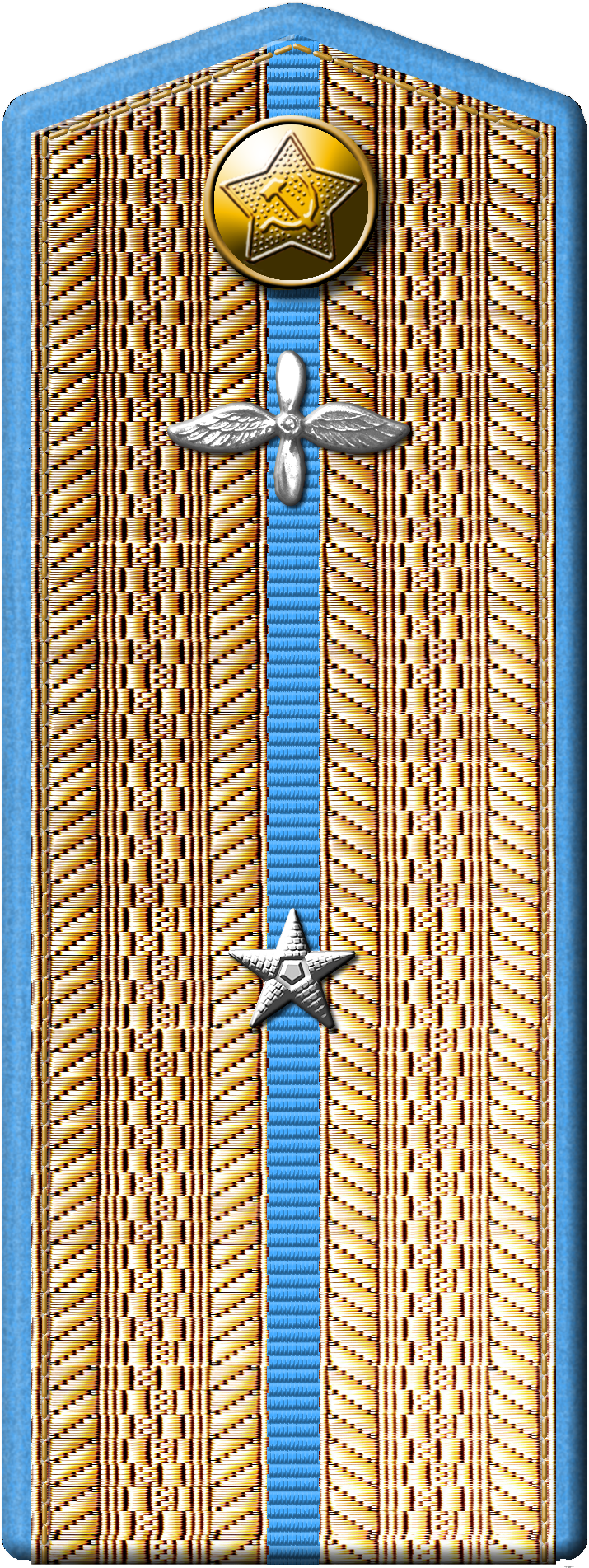
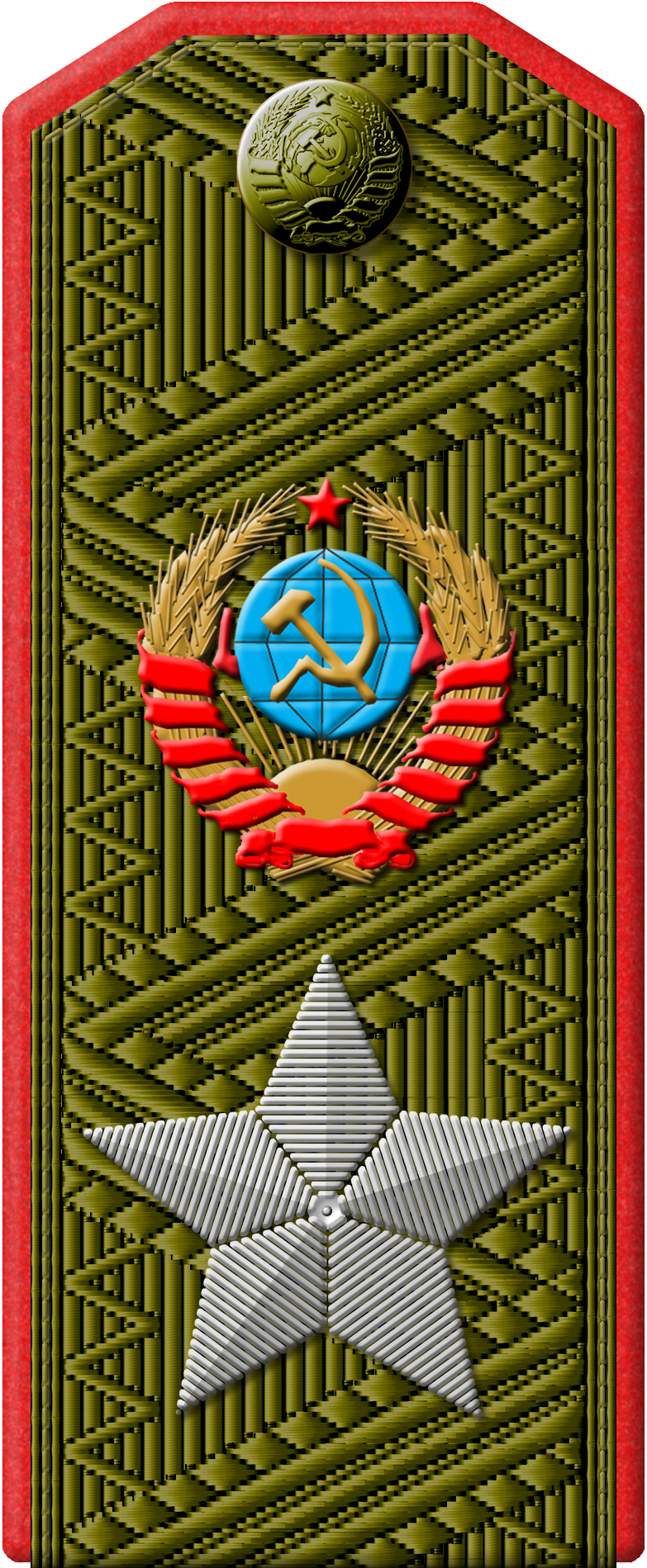
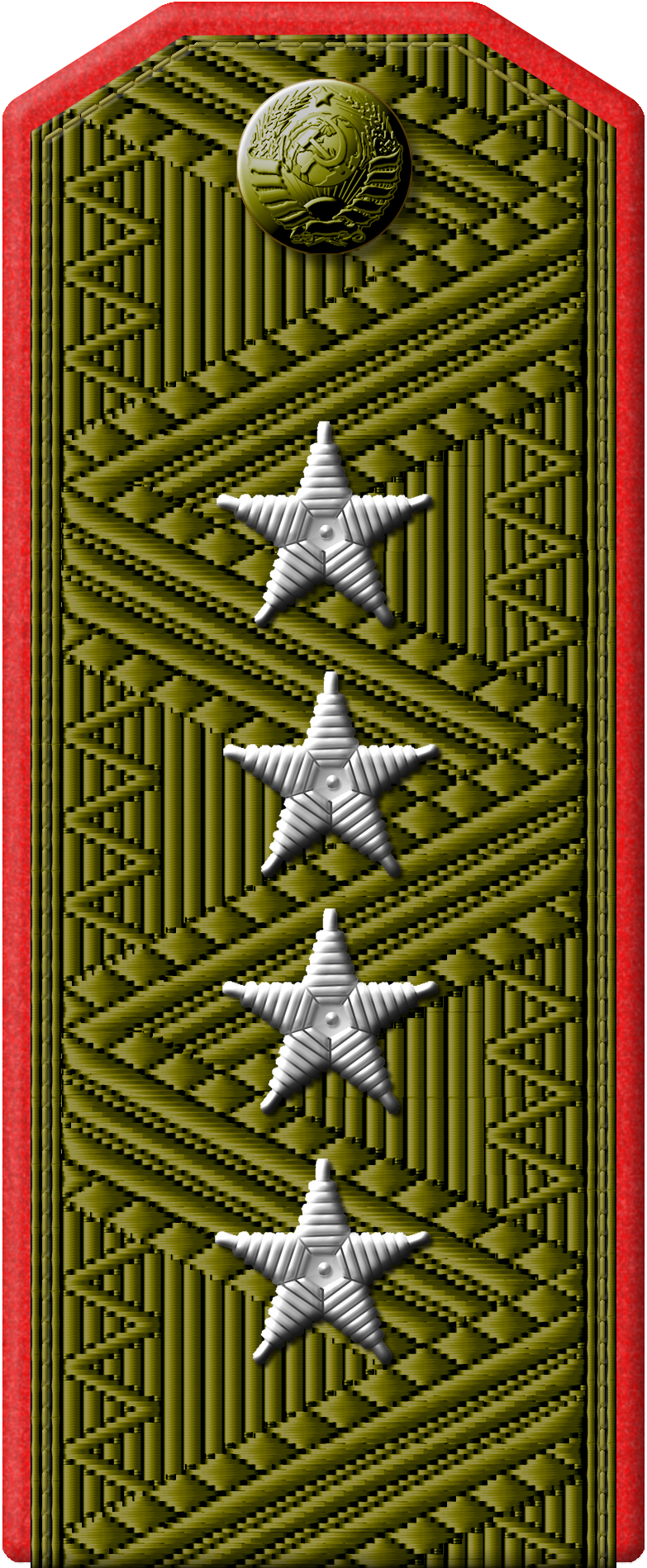
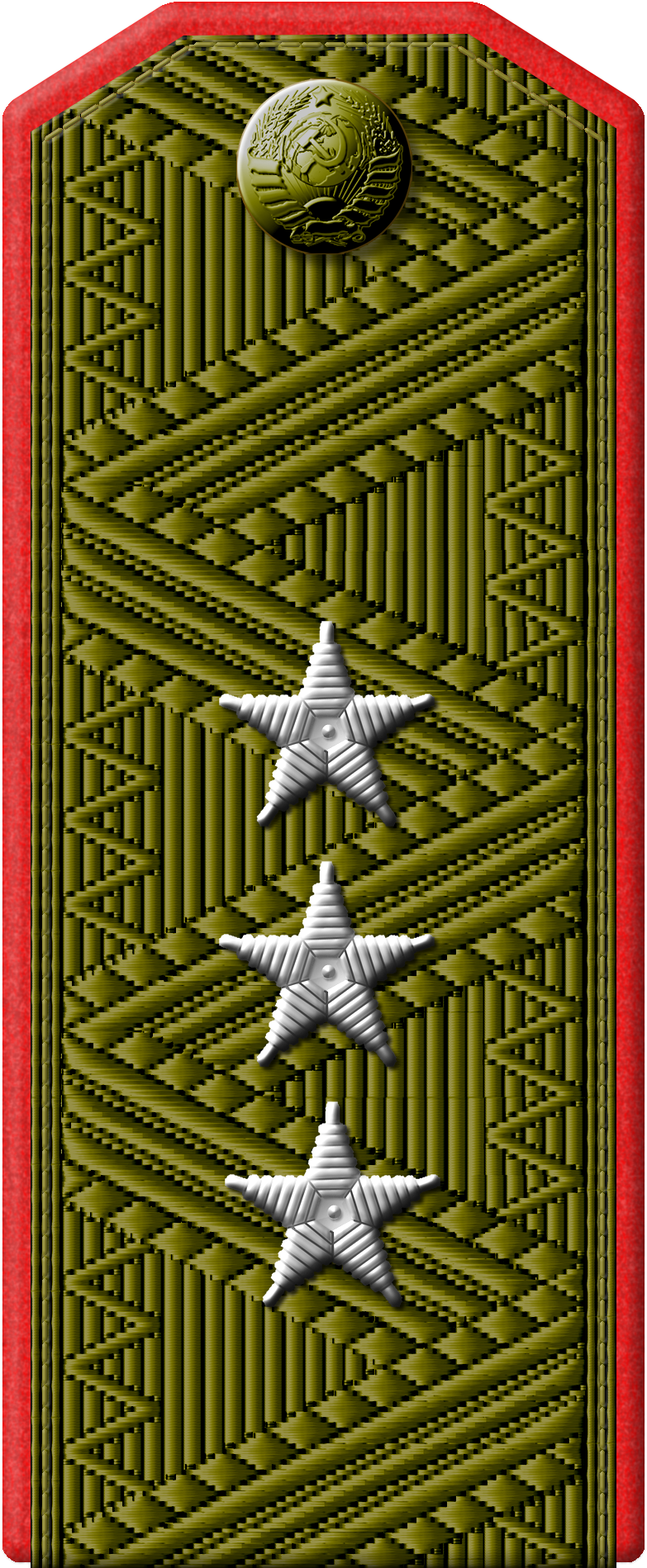
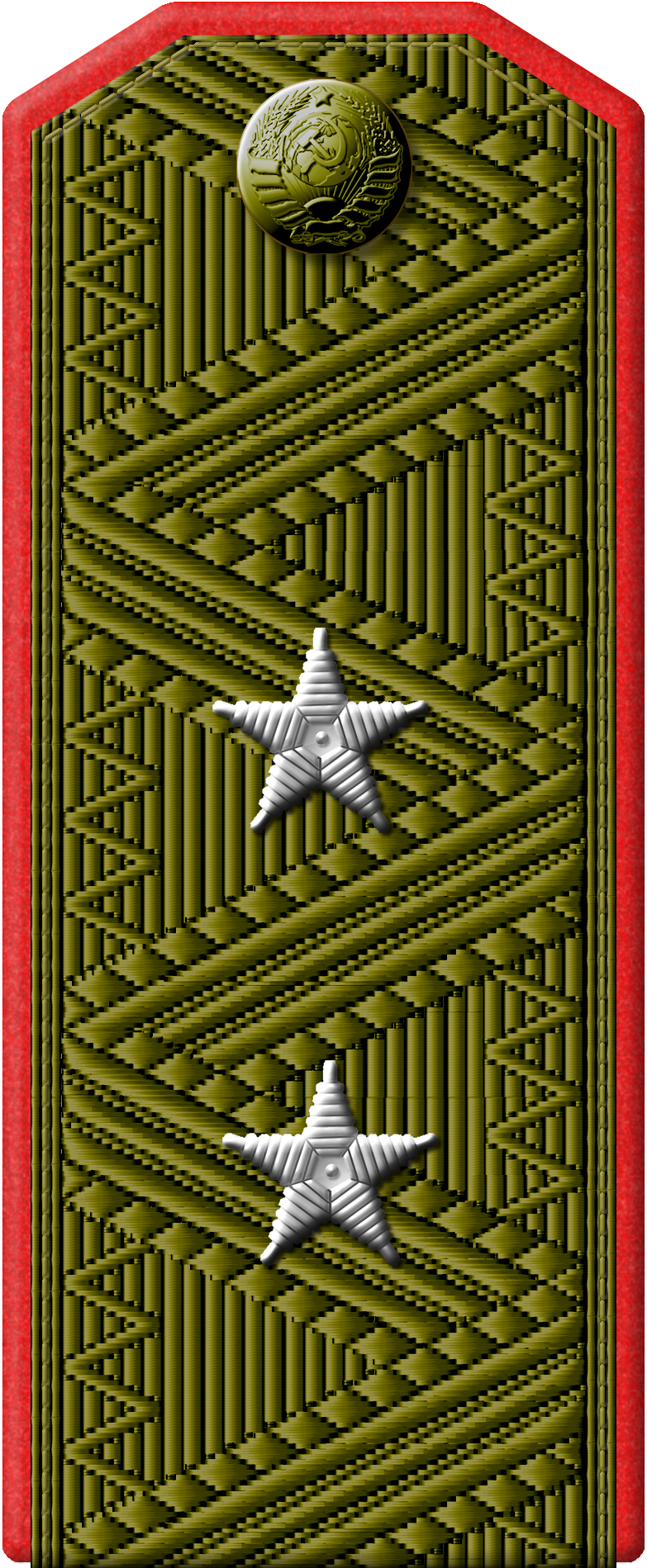
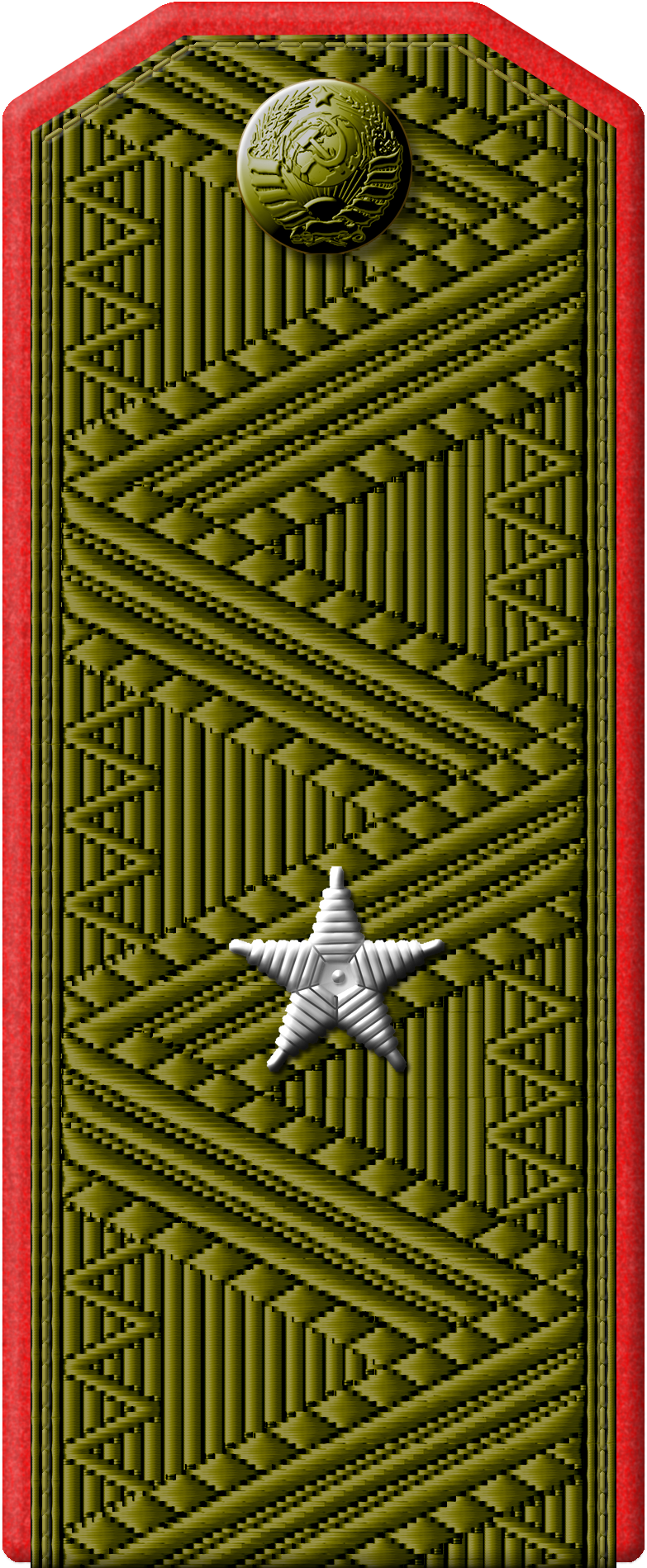
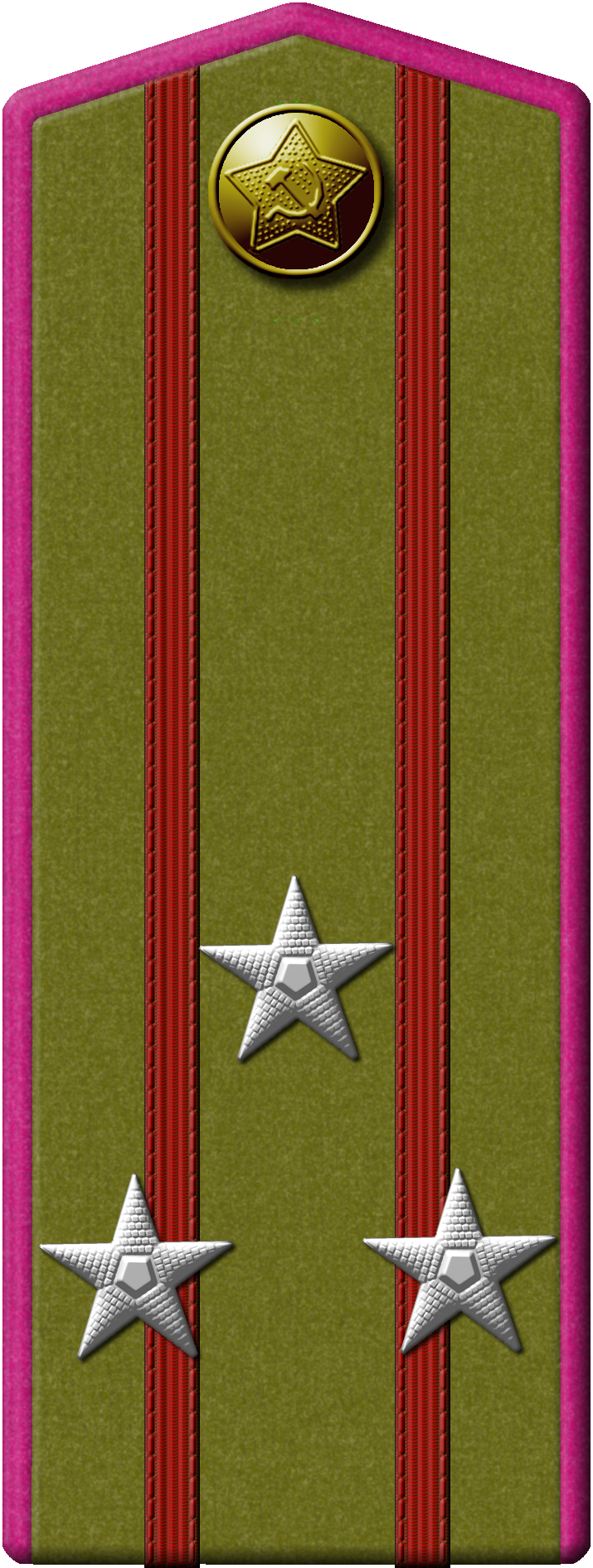
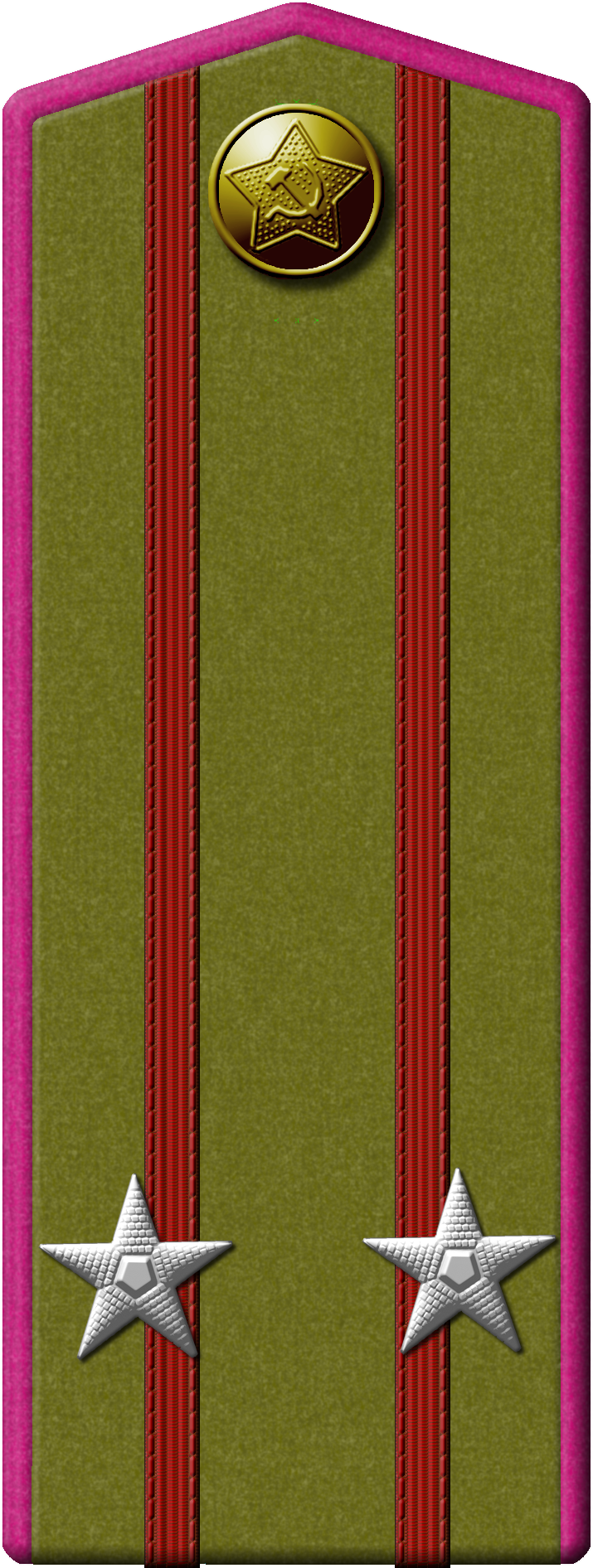
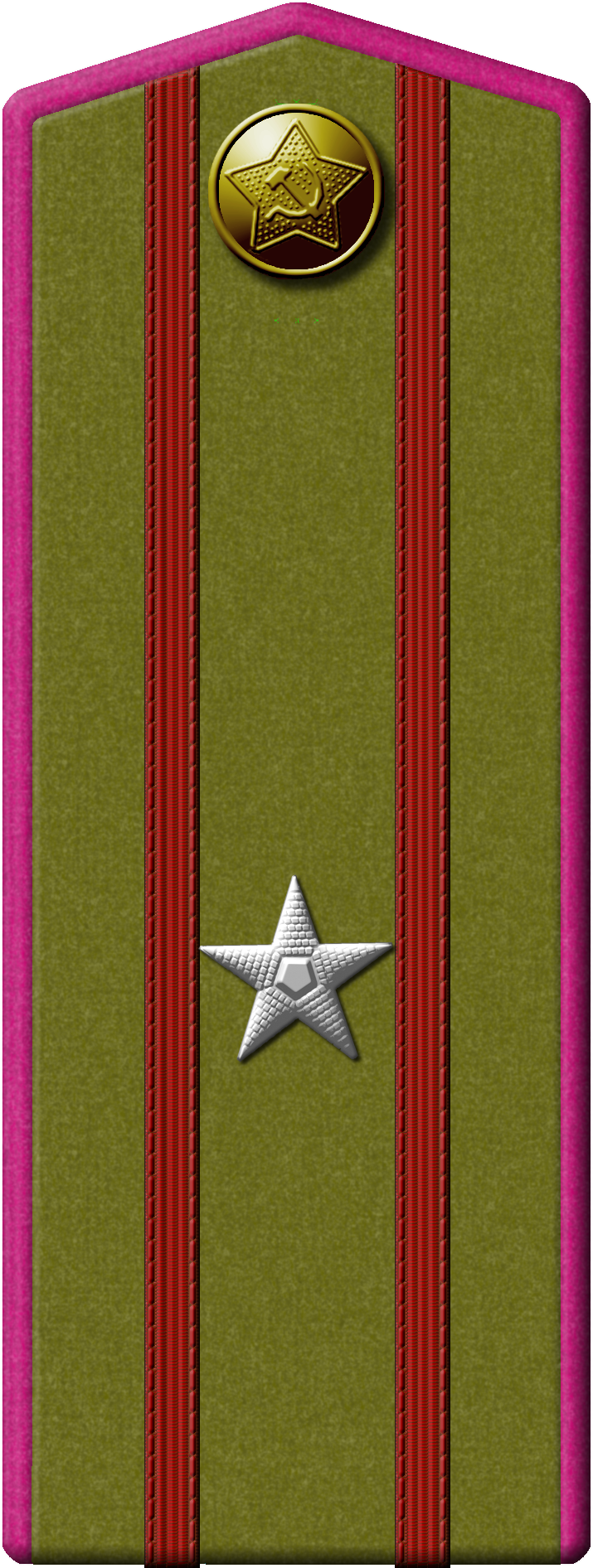
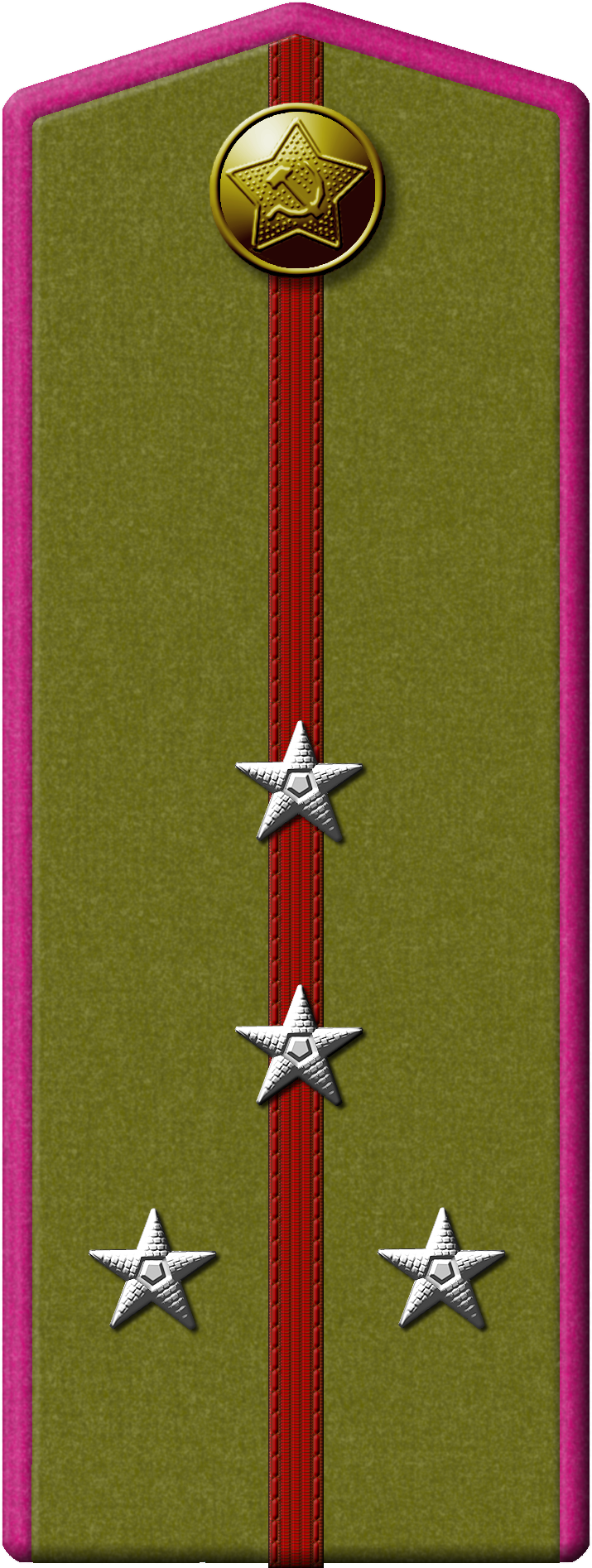
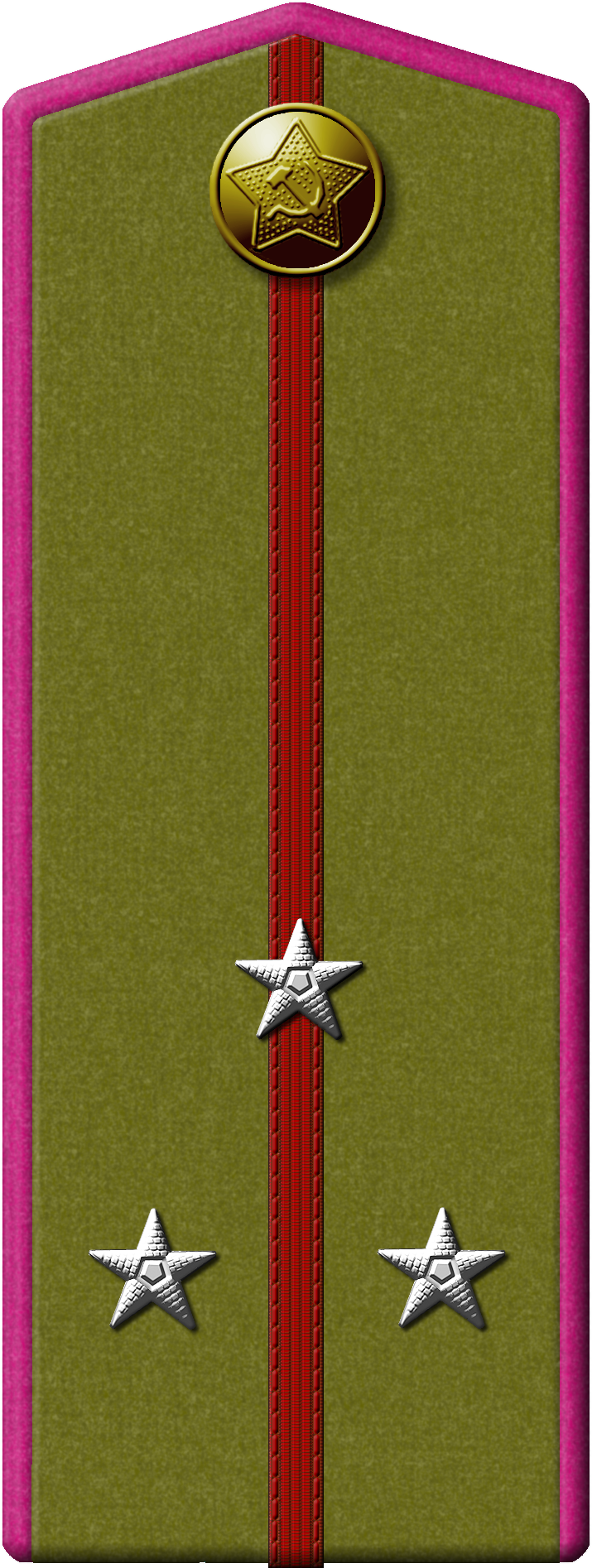
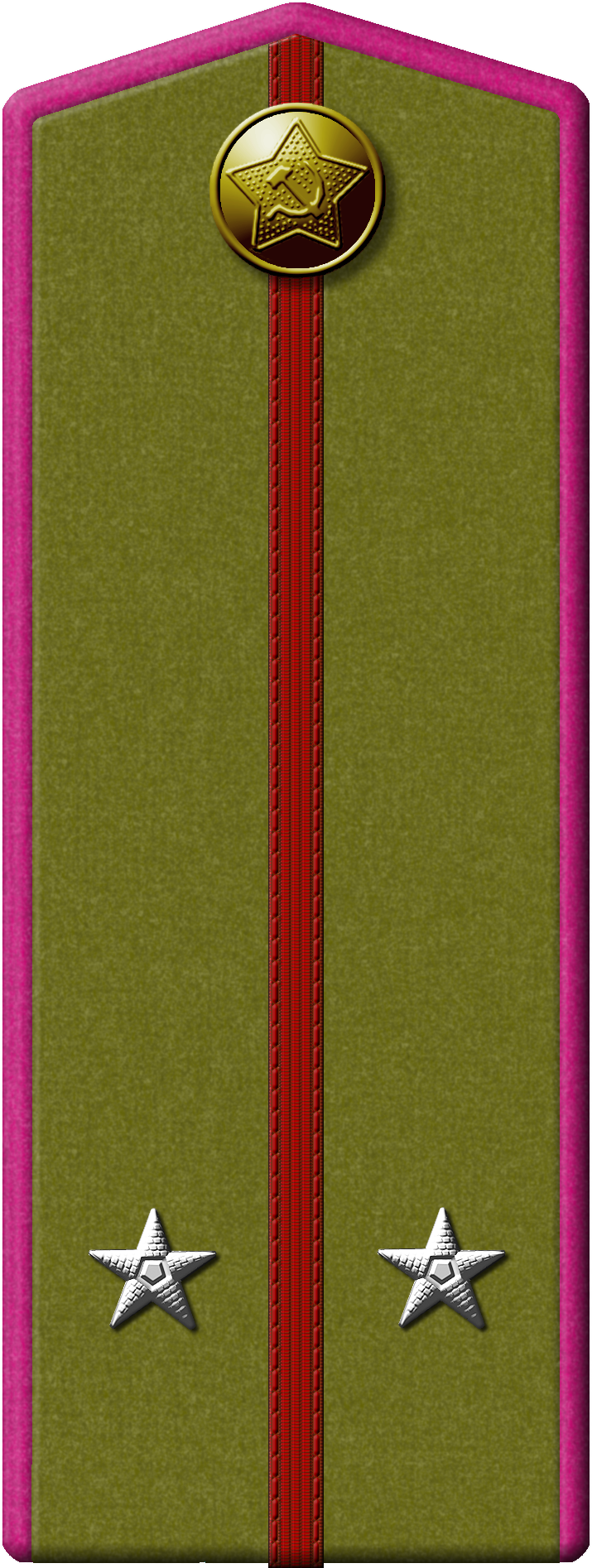
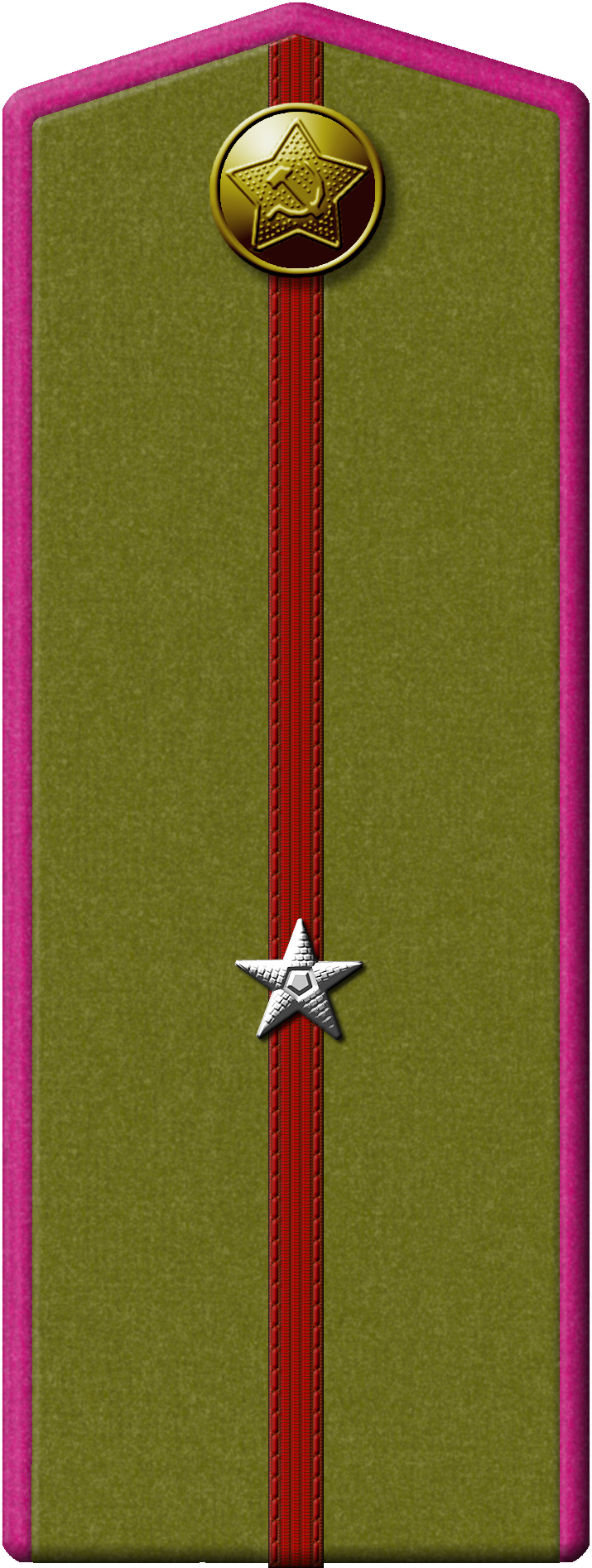
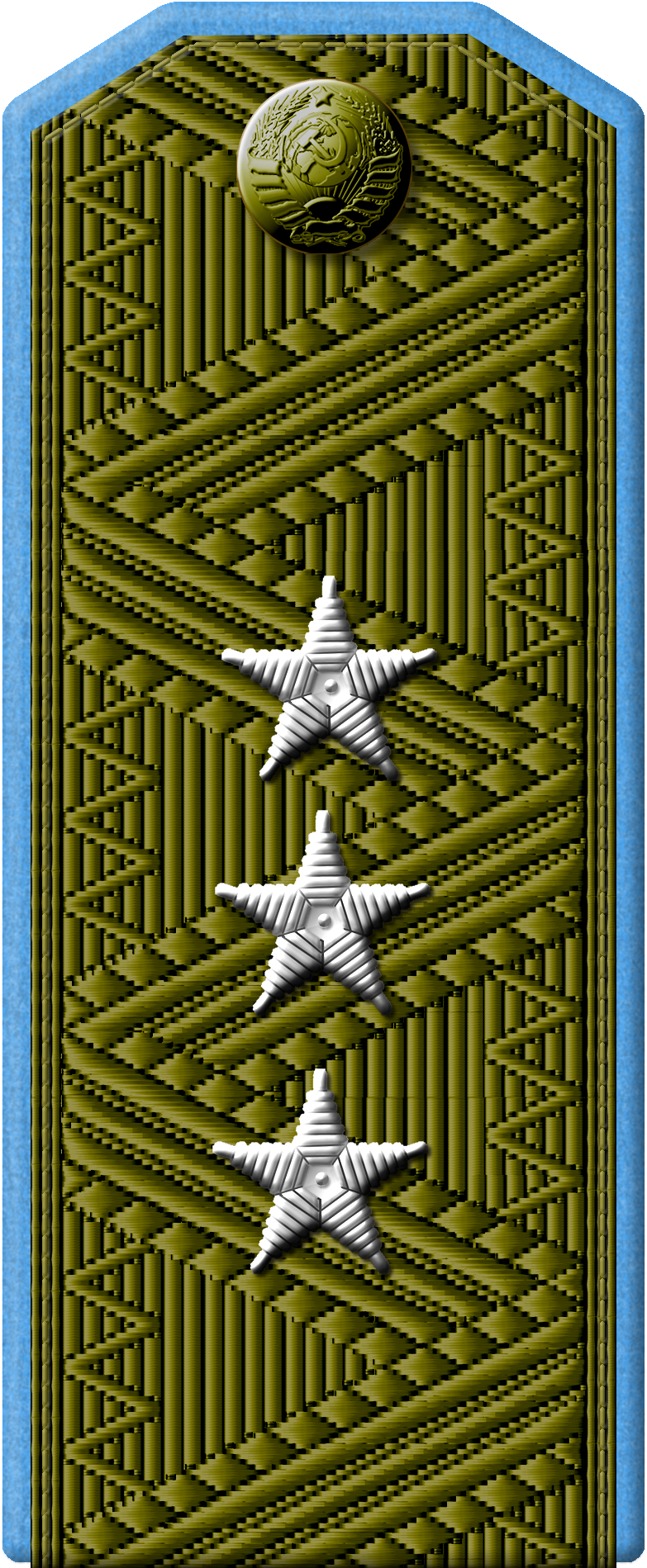
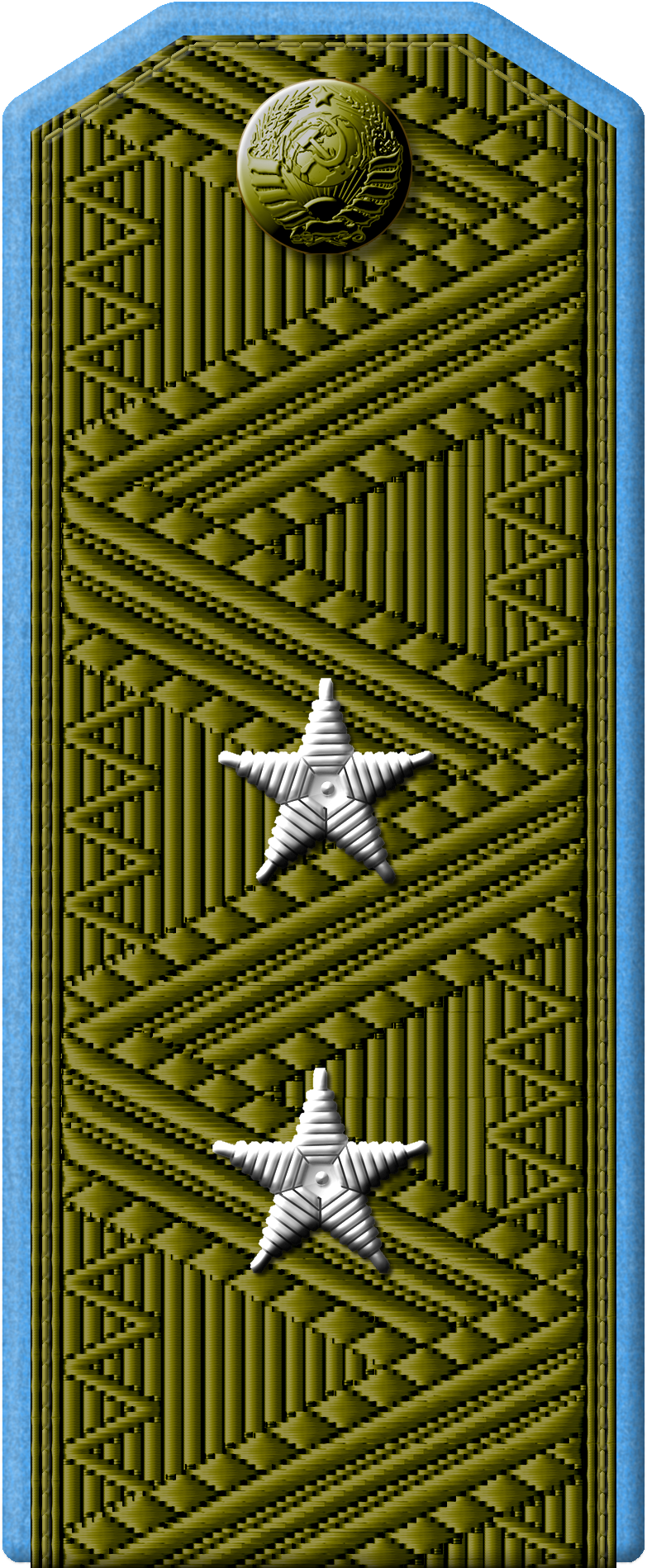
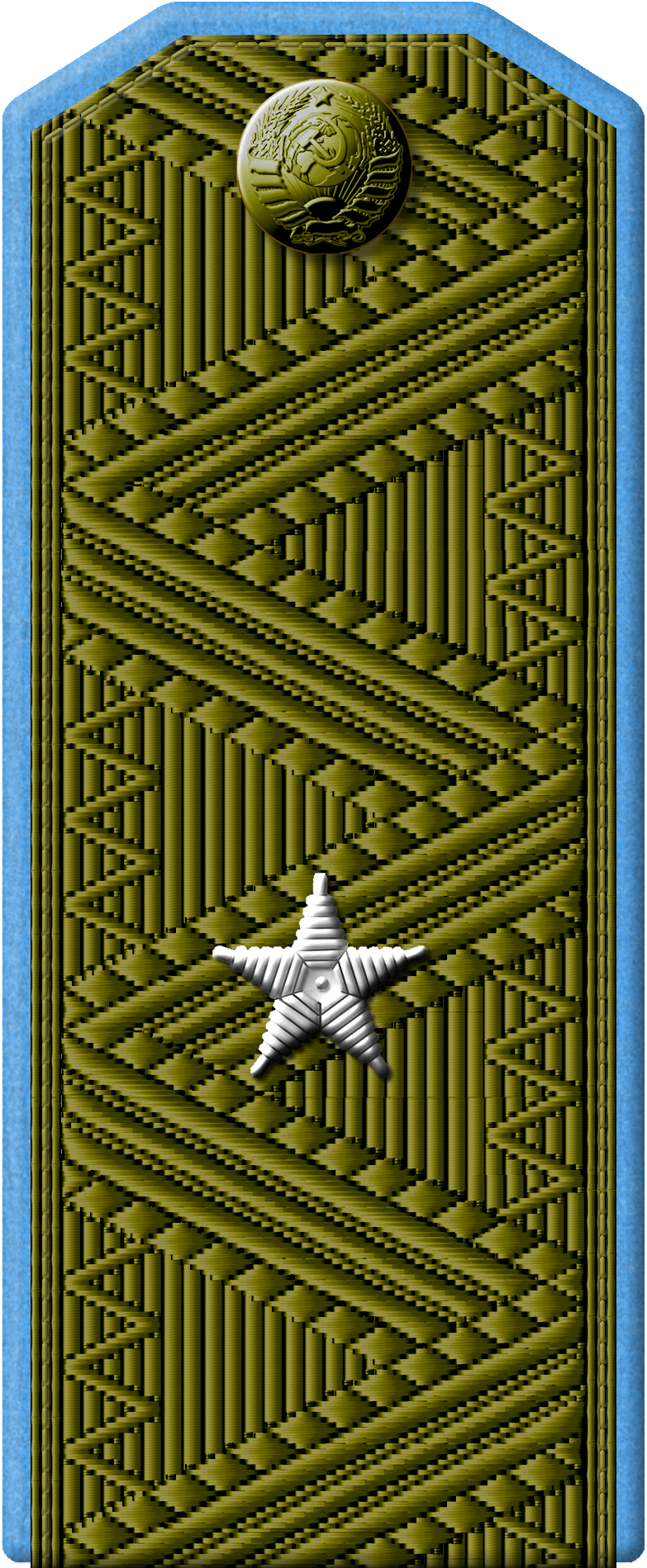
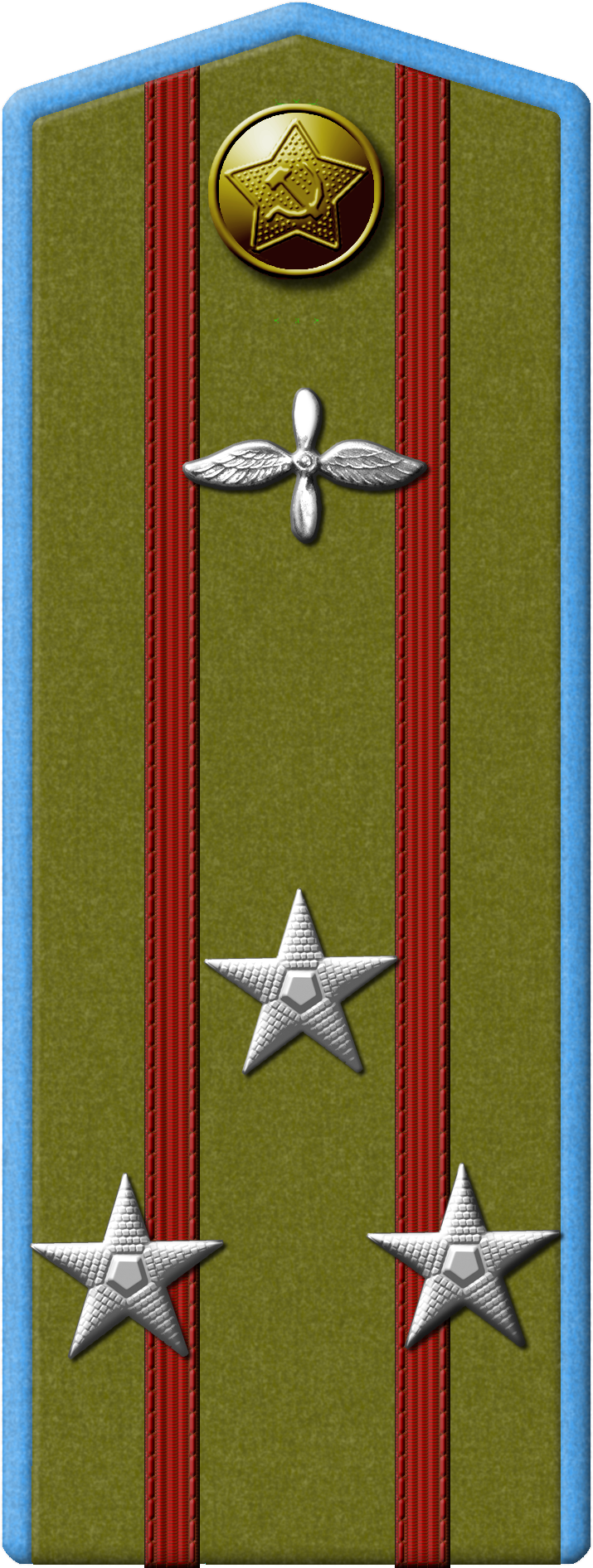
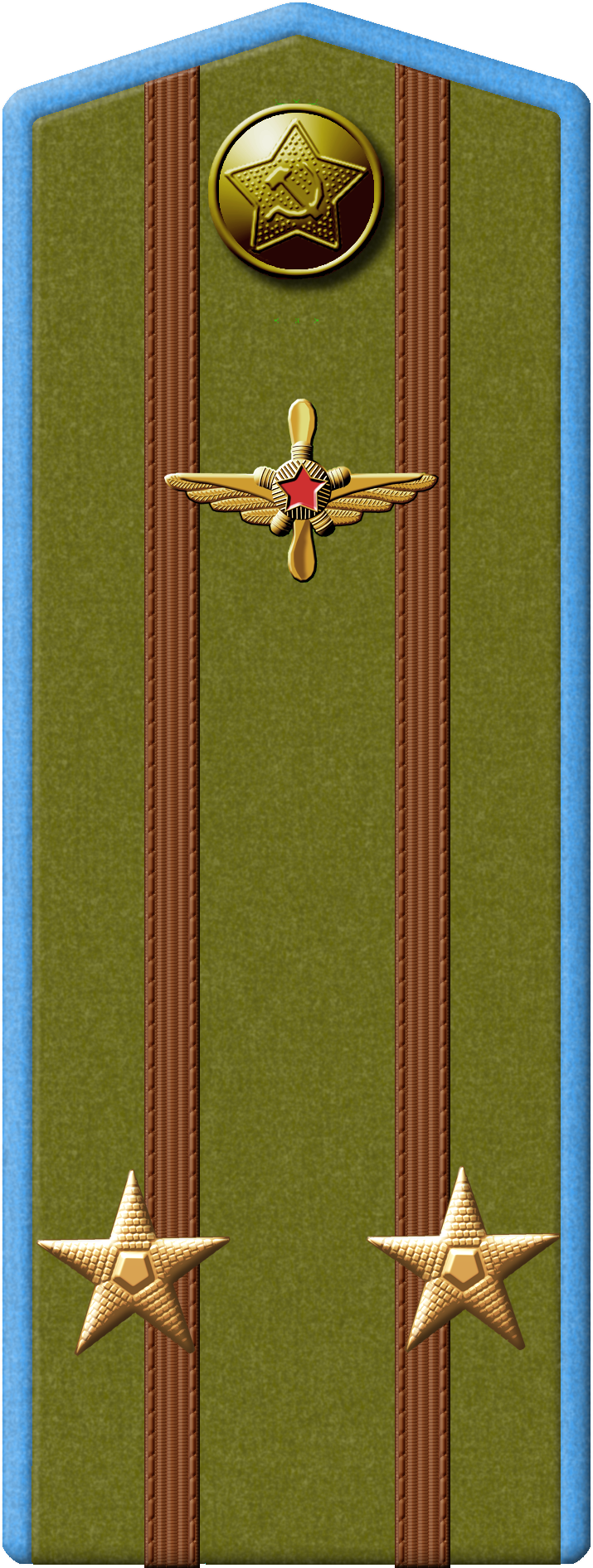
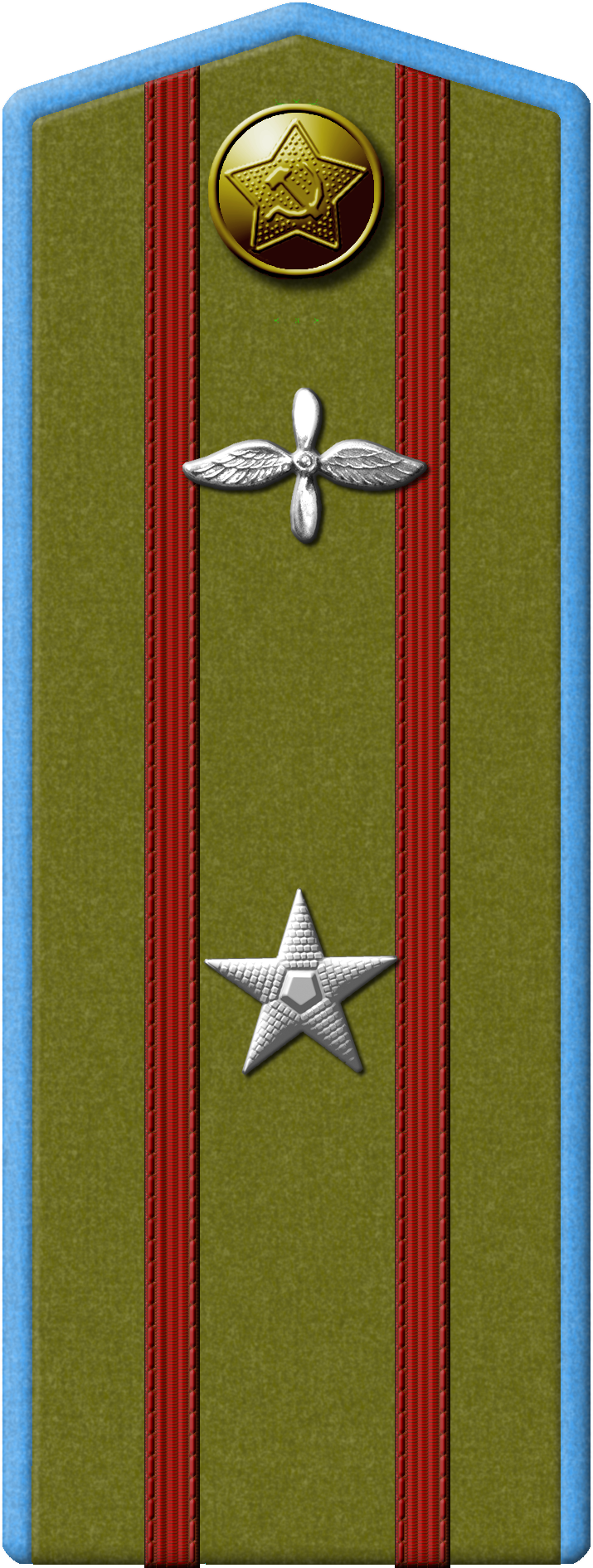
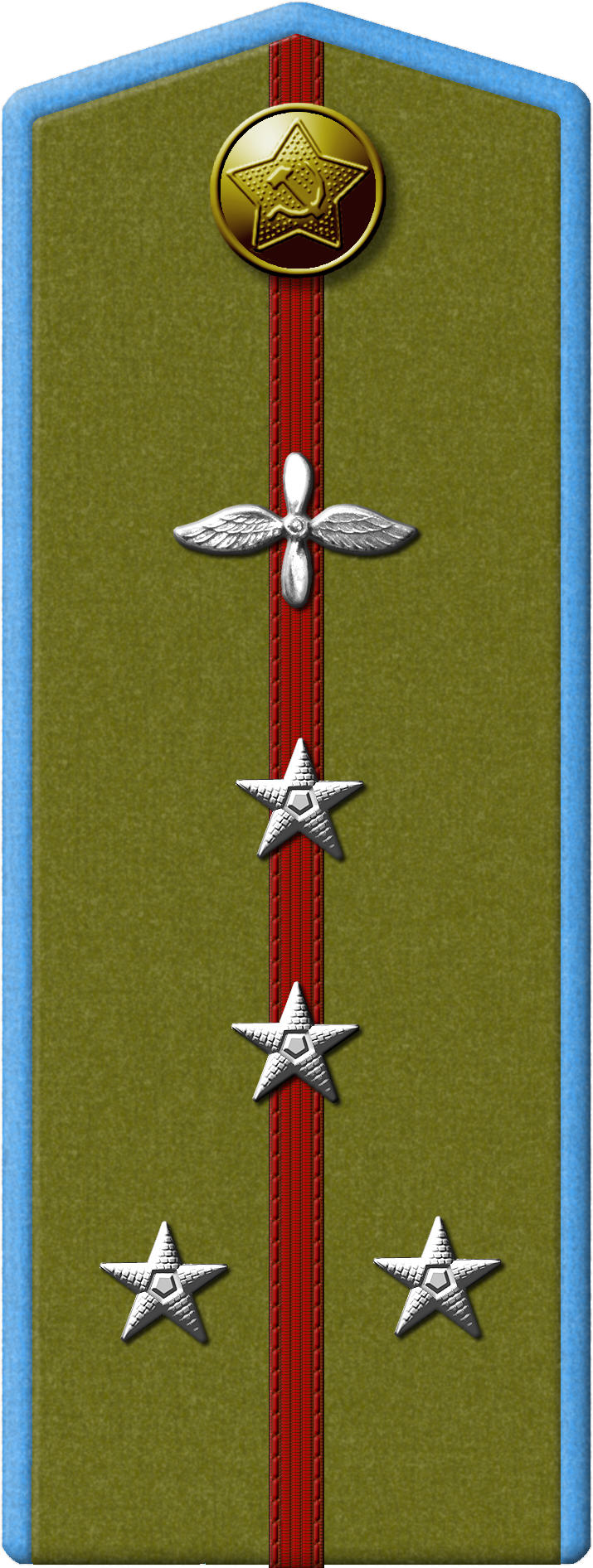
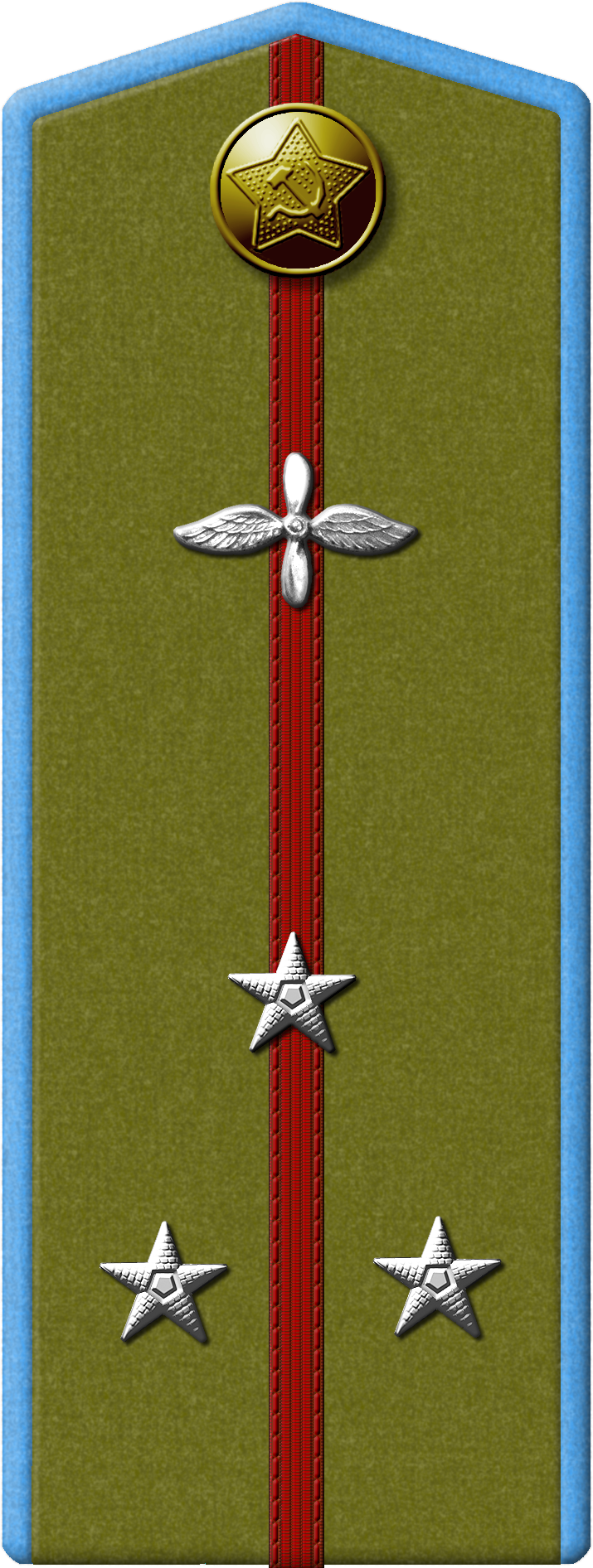
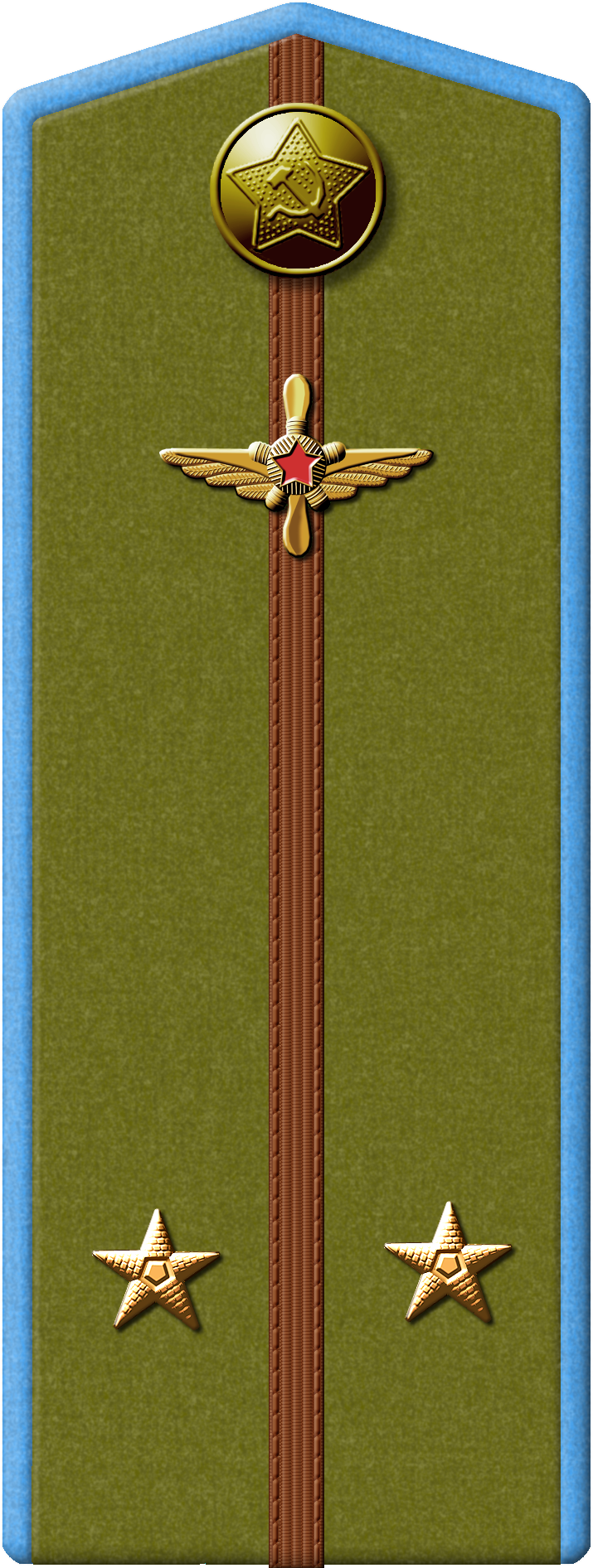
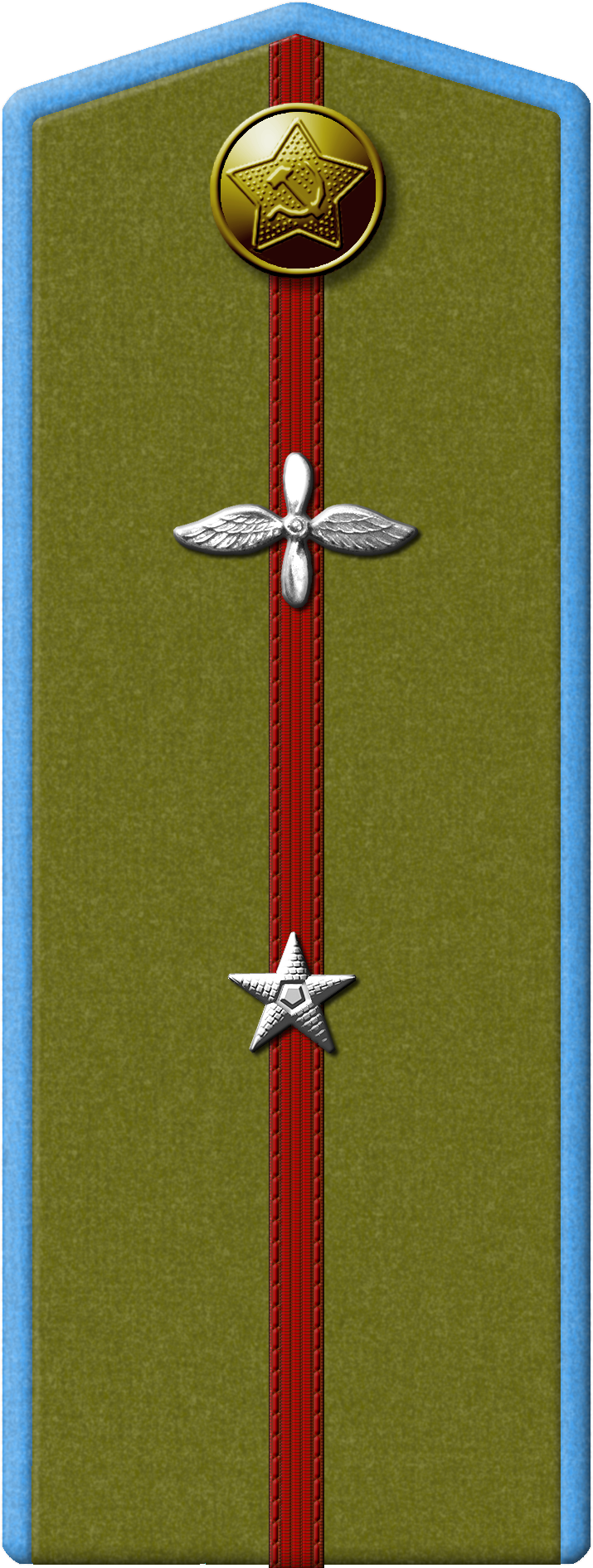
Rank group	General / flag officers					Senior officers			Junior officers
Parade uniform
Infantry
Air force	See above	See above
Field uniform
Infantry
Air force	See above	See above
	Маршал советского союза Marshal sovetskogo soyuza	Генерал армии General armii	Генера́л-полко́вник; Generál-polkóvnik	Генера́л-лейтена́нт; Generál-leytenánt	Генера́л-майо́р; Generál-mayór	Полко́вник; Polkóvnik	Подполко́вник; Podpolkóvnik	Майо́р; Majór	Kапита́н; Kapitán	Старший лейтена́нт Stárshiy leytenánt	Лейтенант; Leytenant	Mла́дший лейтена́нт Mládshiy leytenánt
Translation	Marshal of the Soviet Union	General of the army	Colonel general	Lieutenant general	Major general	Colonel	Lieutenant colonel	Major	Captain	Senior lieutenant	Lieutenant	Junior lieutenant

===== Variations =====
Service, field and engineering uniform for various officers.

Insignia	Armoured Troops	Artillery	Cavalry	Chemical Troops	Electrical Troops
Rank					
Insignia	Engineer Troops	Legal Service	Medical Corps	Motor-Car Units	Pontoon Corps
Rank					
Insignia	Quartermaster Corps	Railway Troops, Military Communications	Road Troops	Sapper Troops	Signal Troops
Rank					
Insignia	Survey Troops	Veterinary Corps			
Rank					

==== Student officers ====
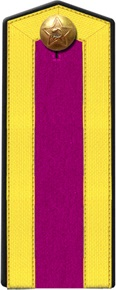
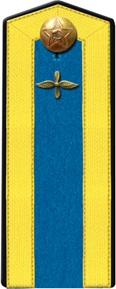
Rank group	Senior NCOs				Junior NCOs	Enlisted
Parade uniform
Army
Air force
	Курсант старшина́ Kursánt starshyná	Курсант ста́рший сержа́нт Kursánt stárshiy serzhánt	Курсант сержа́нт Kursánt serzhánt	Курсант мла́дший сержа́нт Kursánt mládshiy serzhánt	Курсант ефре́йтор Kursánt efréĭtor	Курсант; Kursánt
Translation	Cadet sergeant major	Cadet senior sergeant	Cadet sergeant	Cadet junior sergeant	Cadet first class	Cadet

== Ranks and rank insignia of the Soviet Navy ==
By decree of the Presidium of the Supreme Soviet on 15 February 1943 on "distinction insignia to the Soviet Navy" the introduction of shoulder straps and epaulettes took effect, marking the début of Imperial Russian Navy-style insignia to the Soviet Navy. As the navy also had coastal services, ground ranks similar to the Red Army and Air Force were introduced with their respective insignia to be used by the coastal service personnel. These ranks were also used by the navy's medical corps and technical services. Shoulder rank insignia were in dark blue shoulder boards (gold on the dress uniform only for officers).

=== Naval officers and flag officers ===
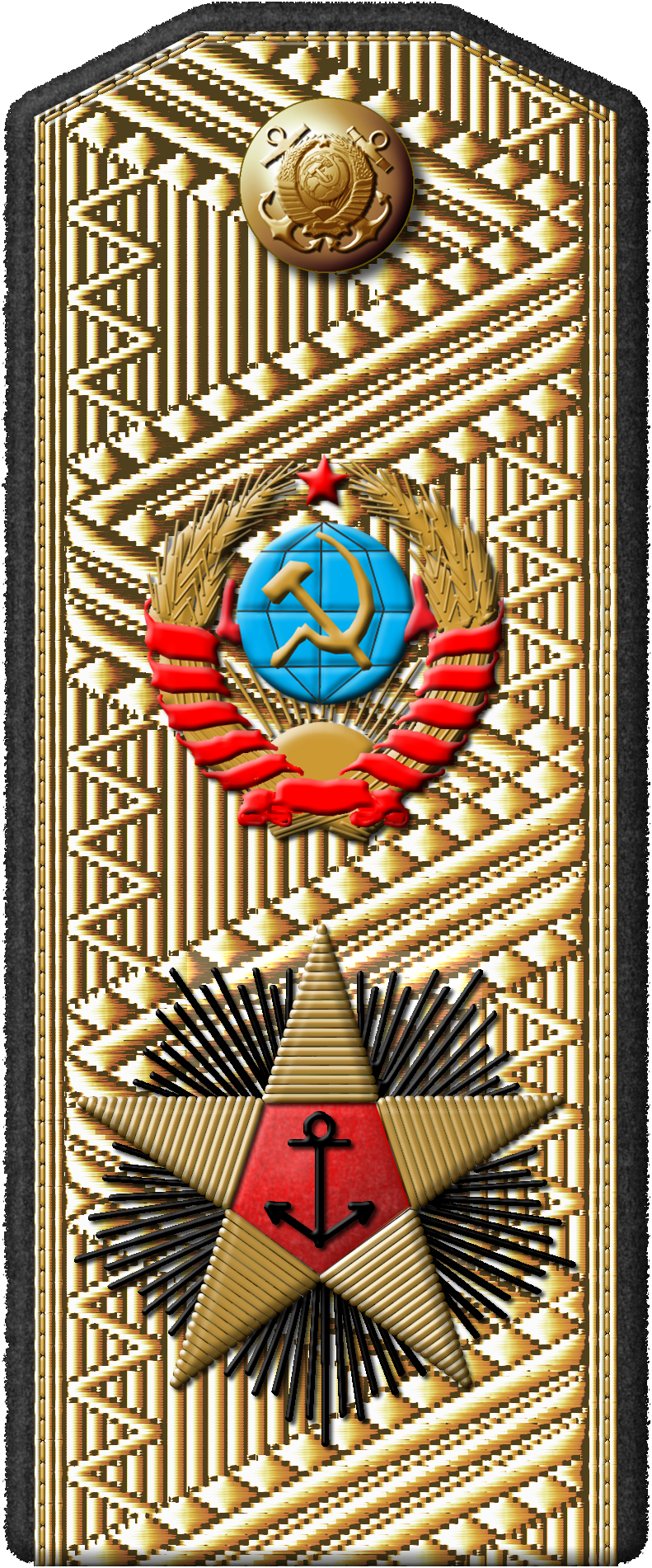
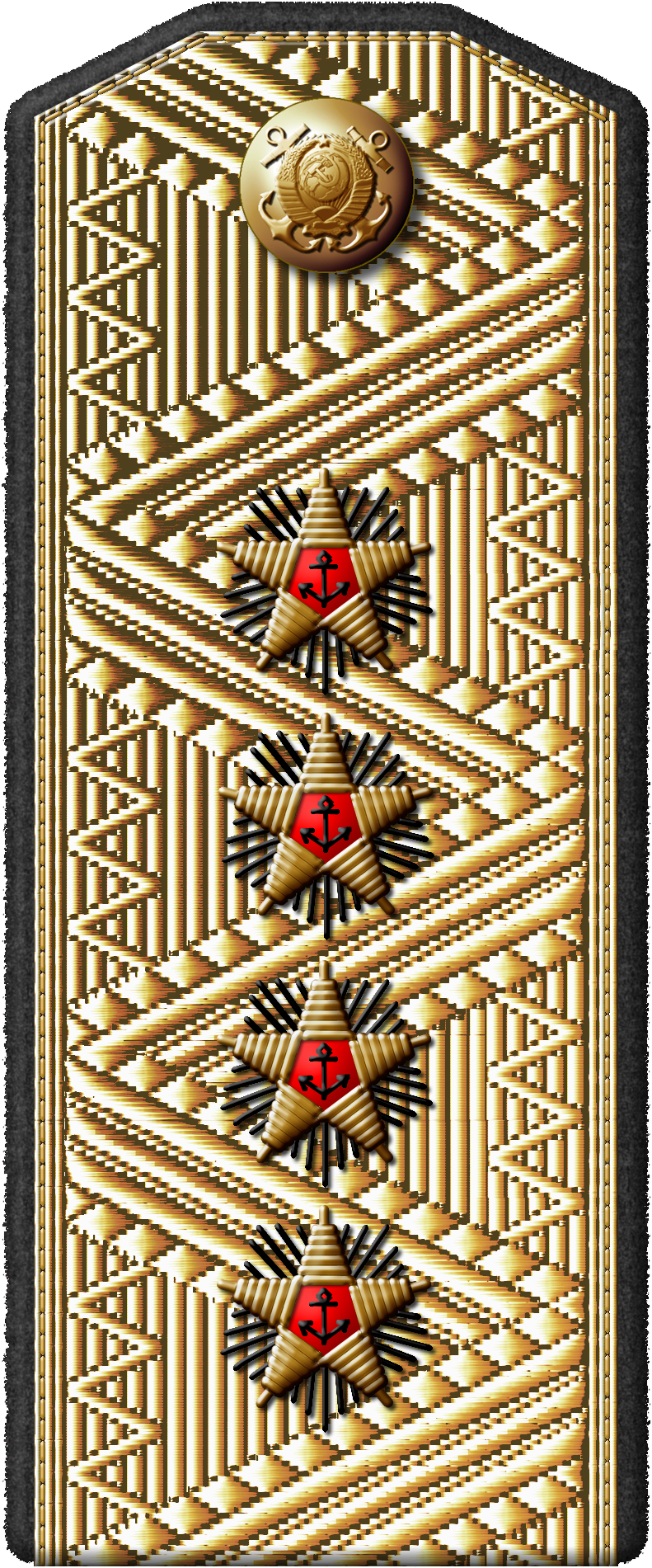
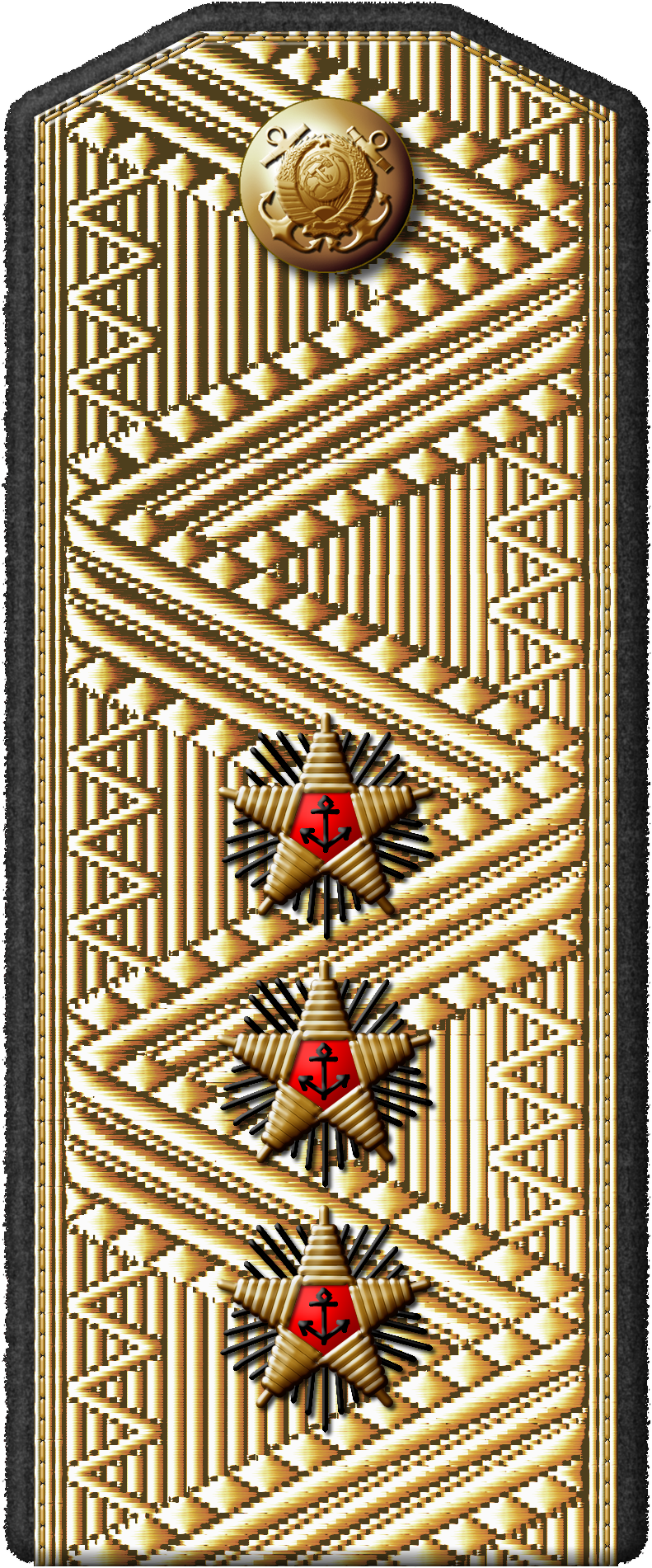
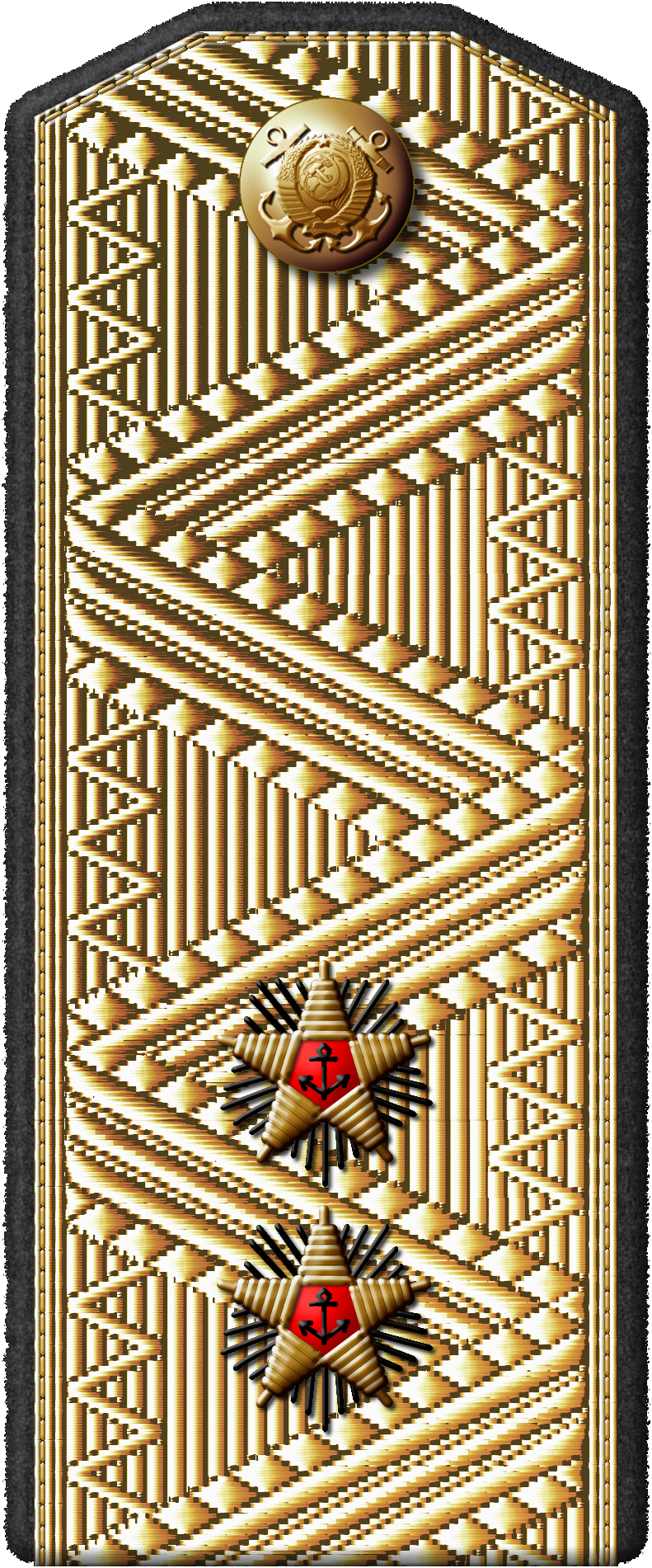
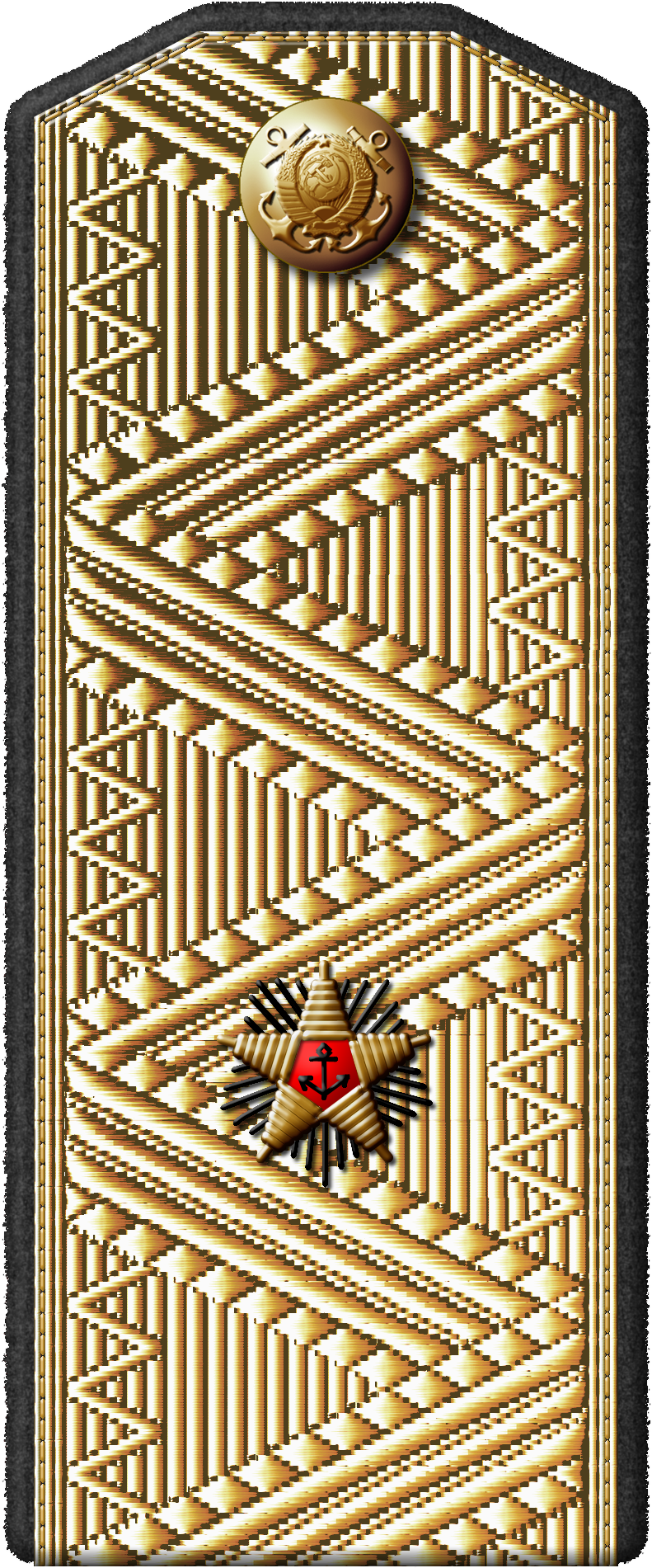
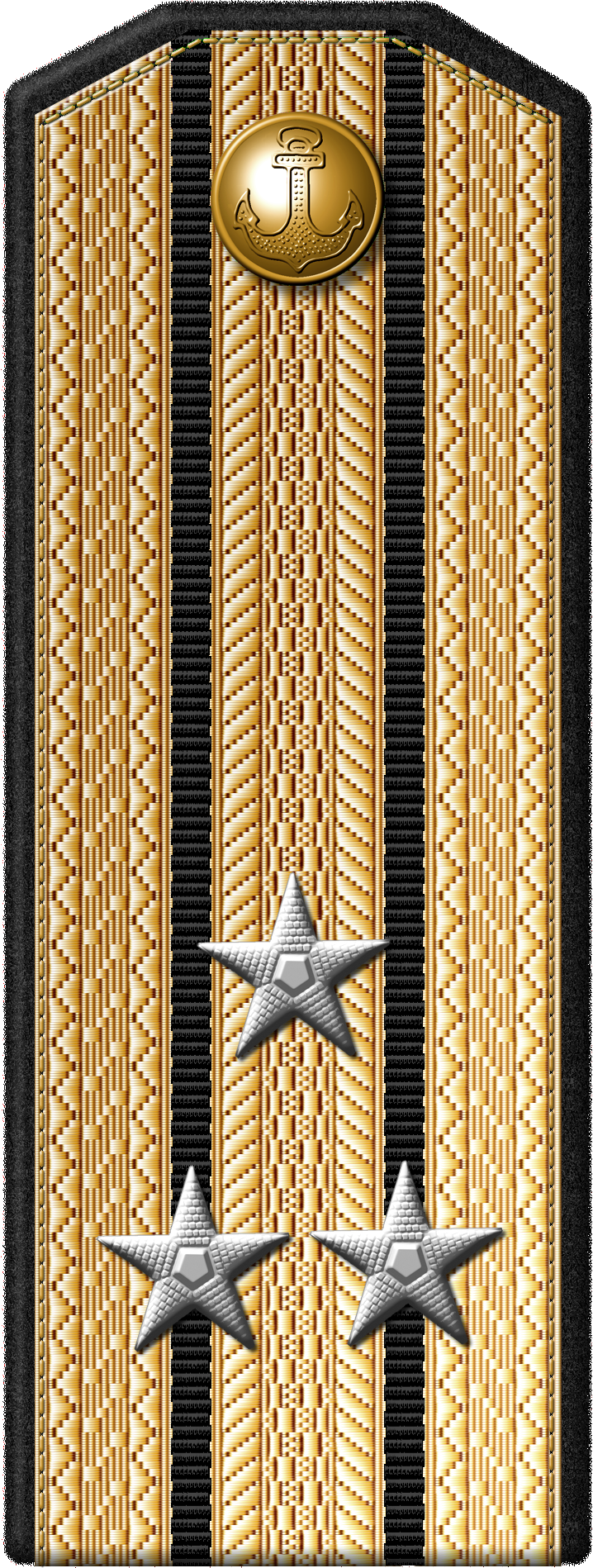
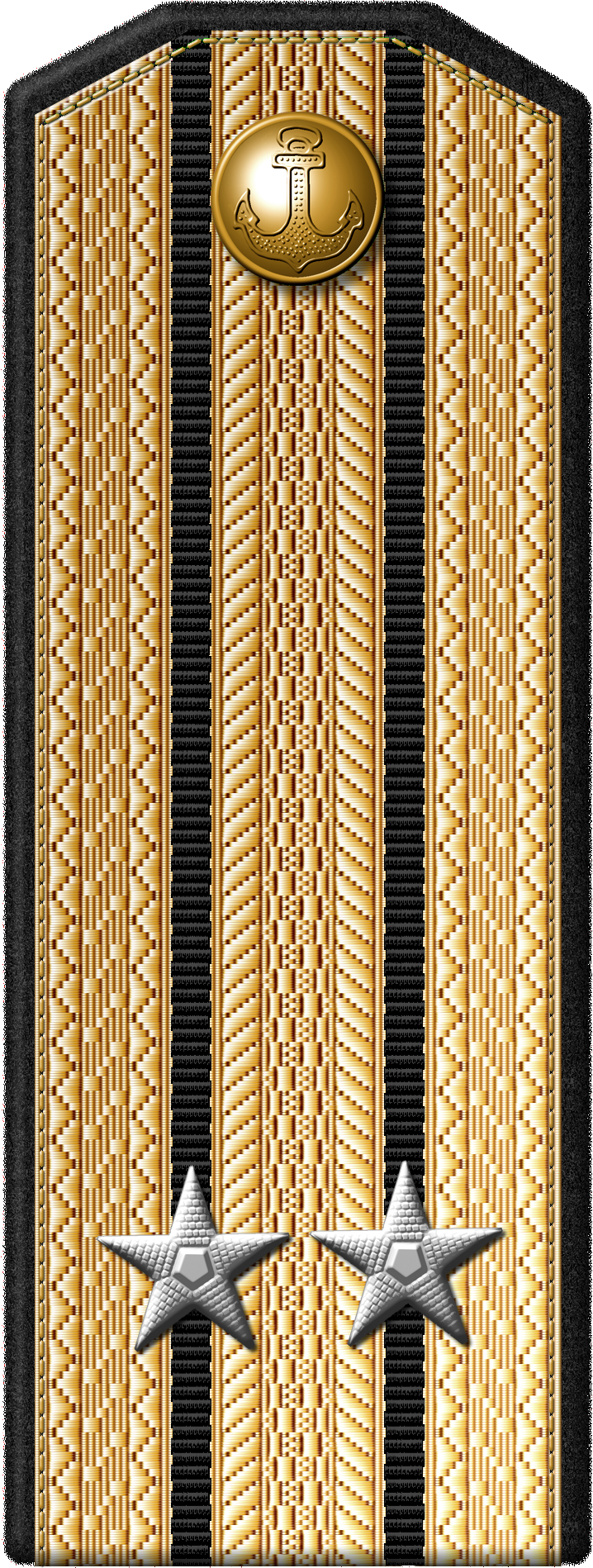
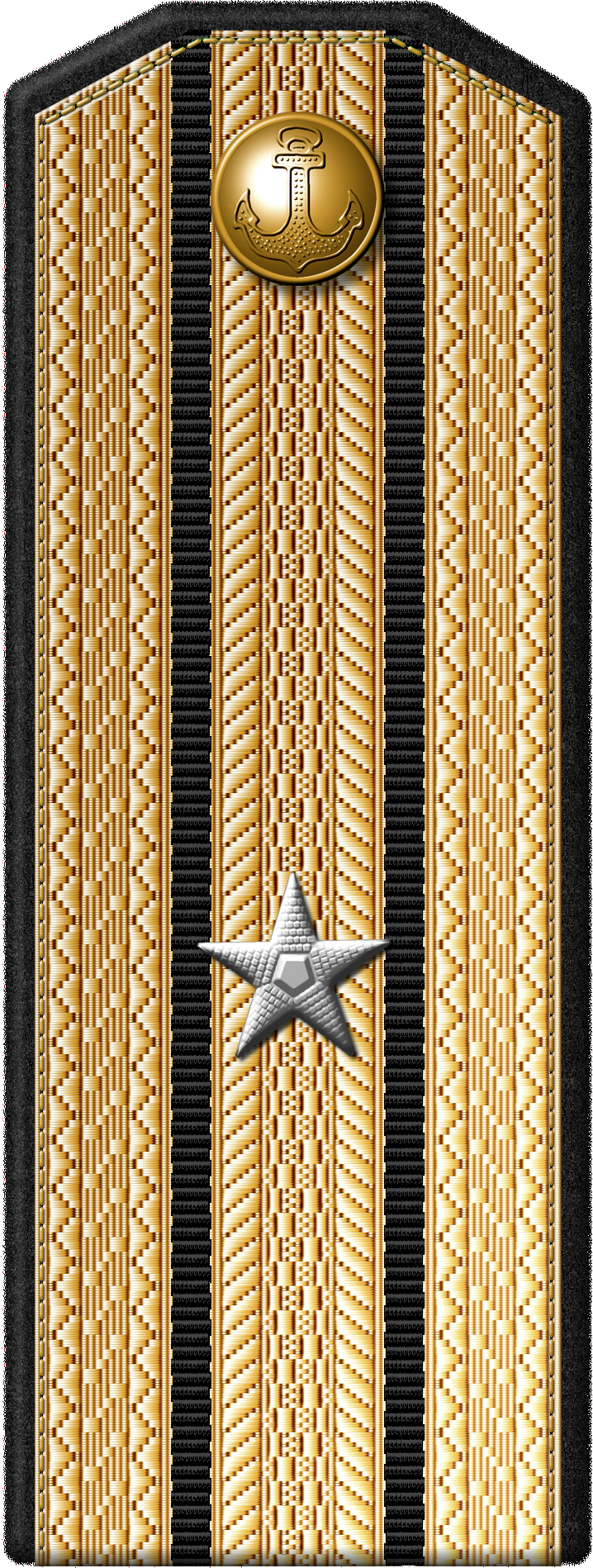
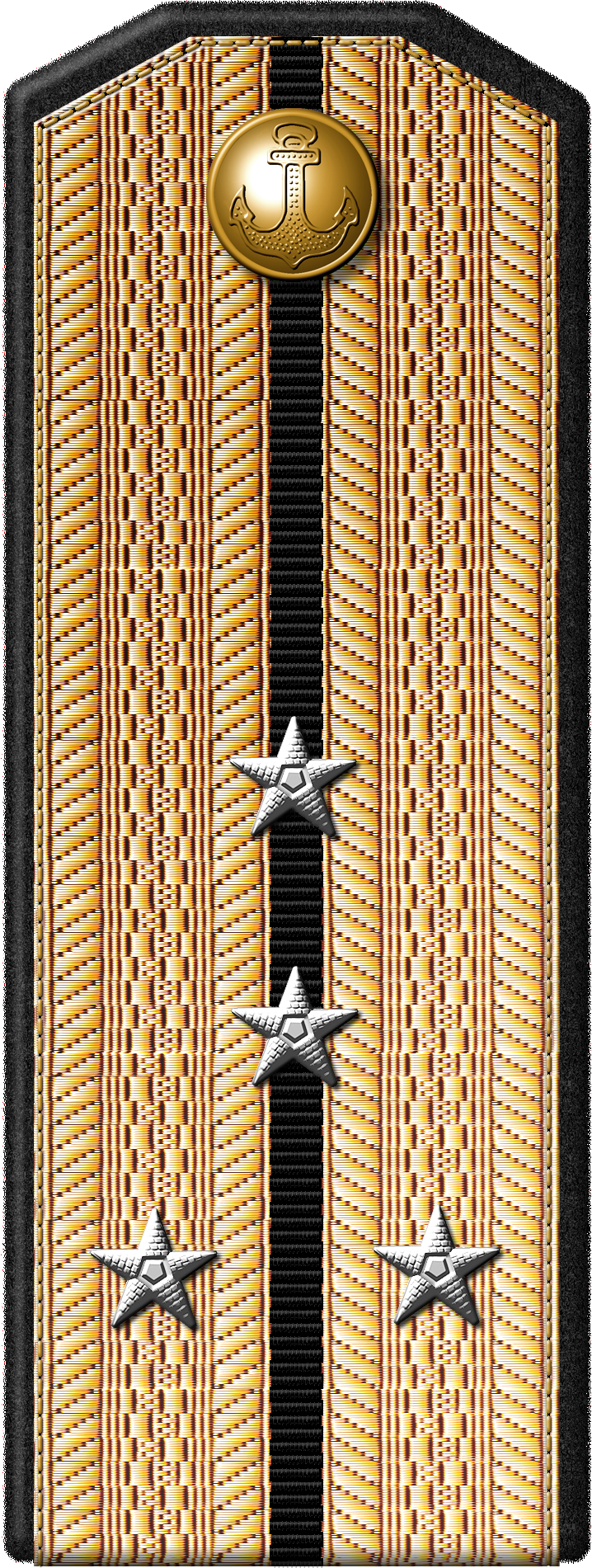
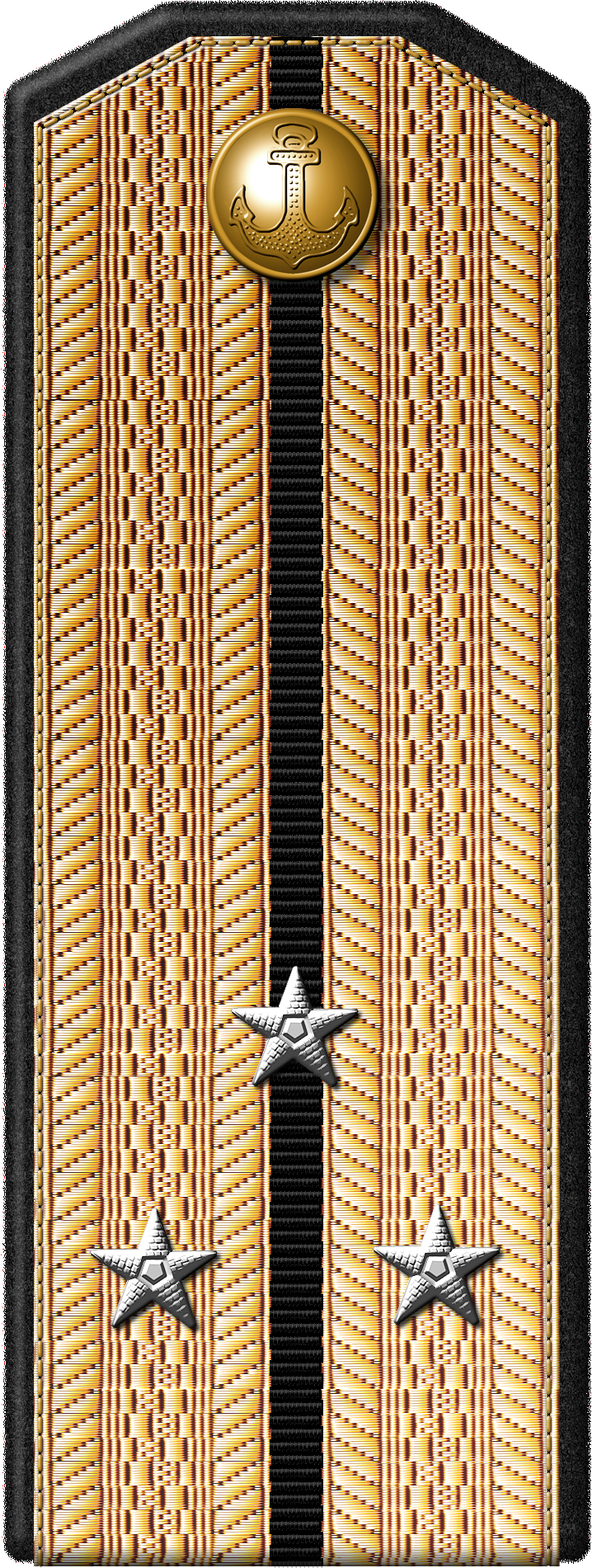
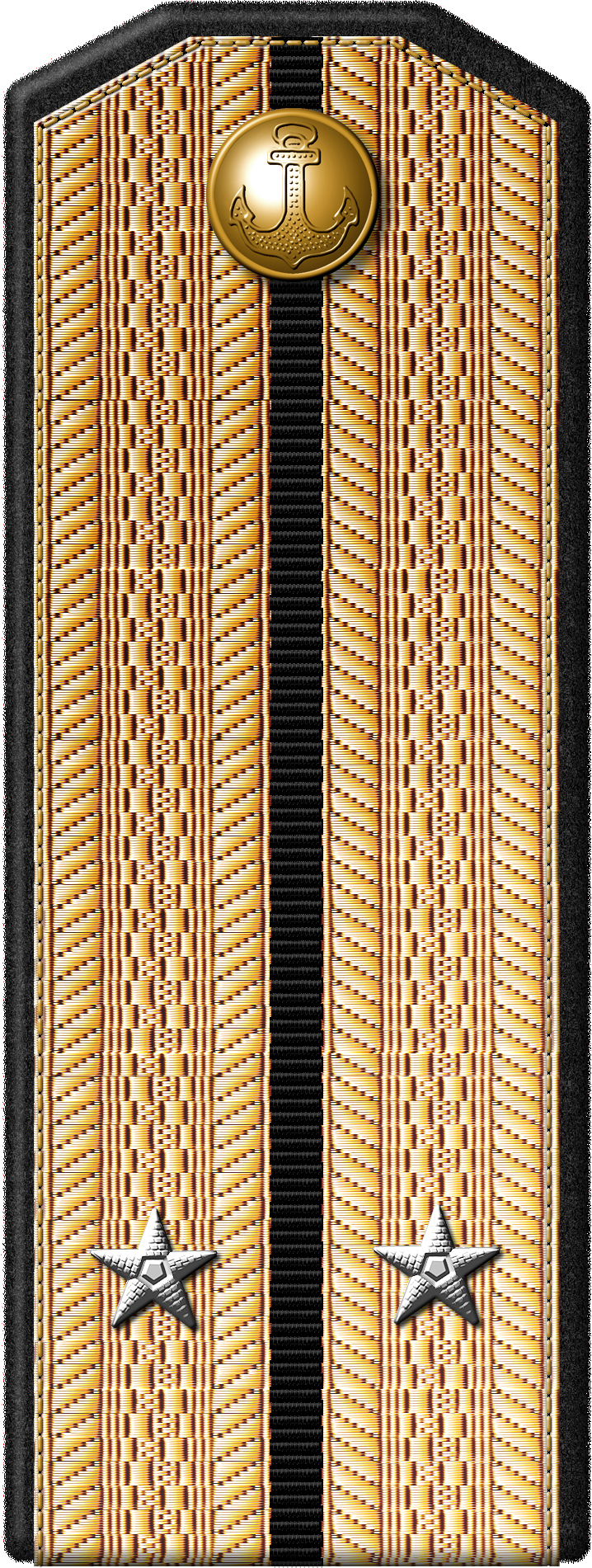
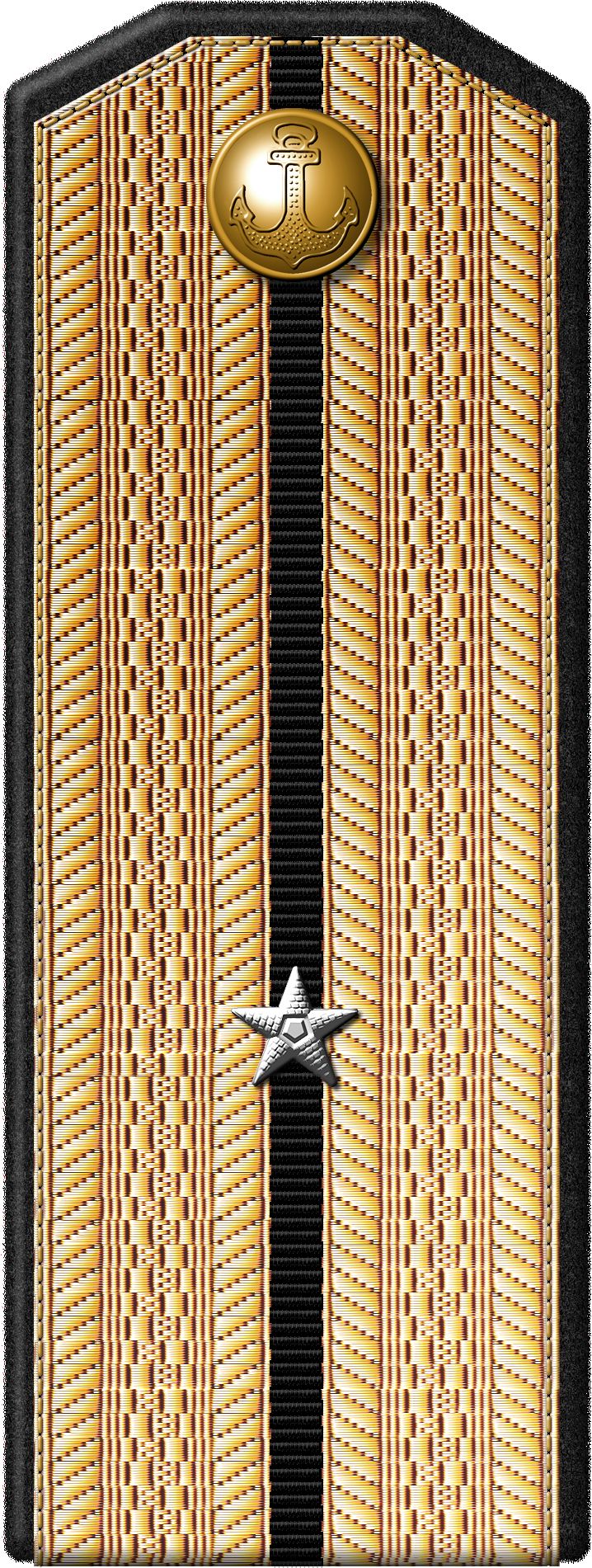
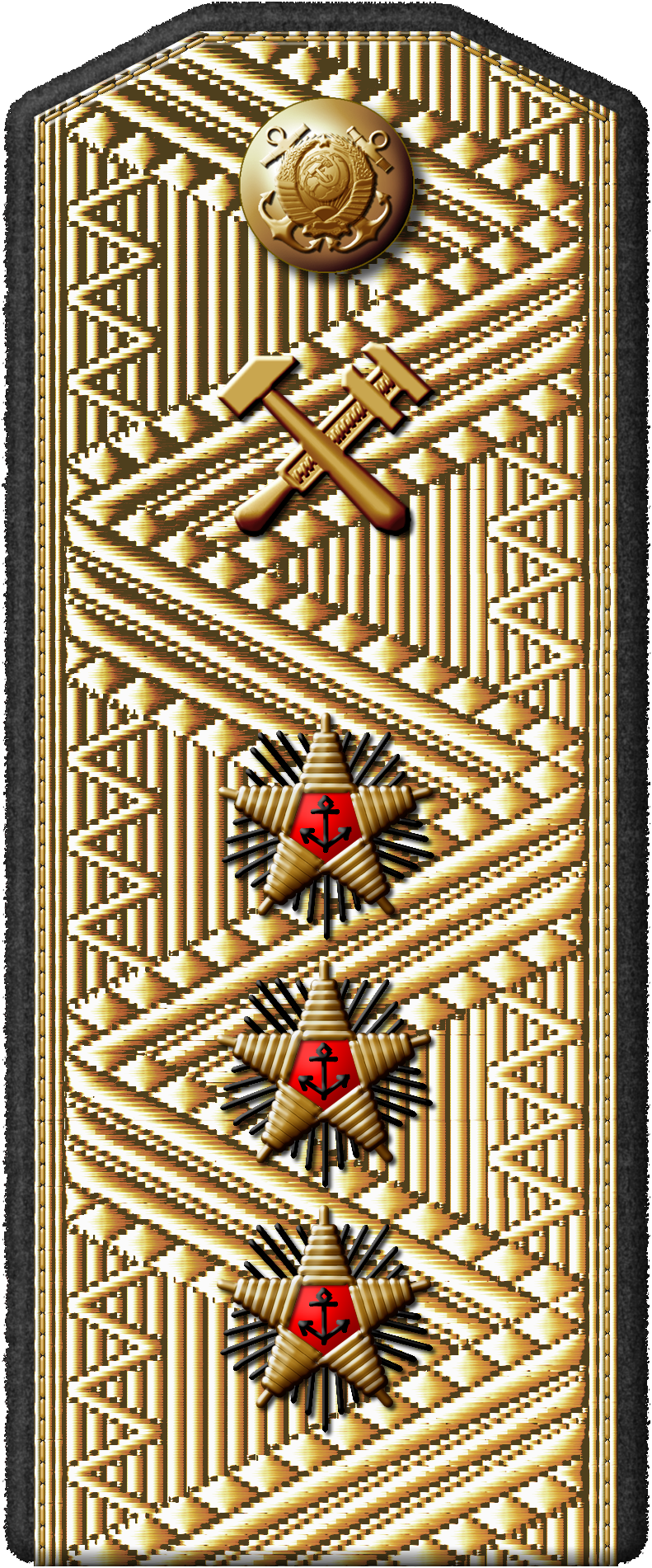
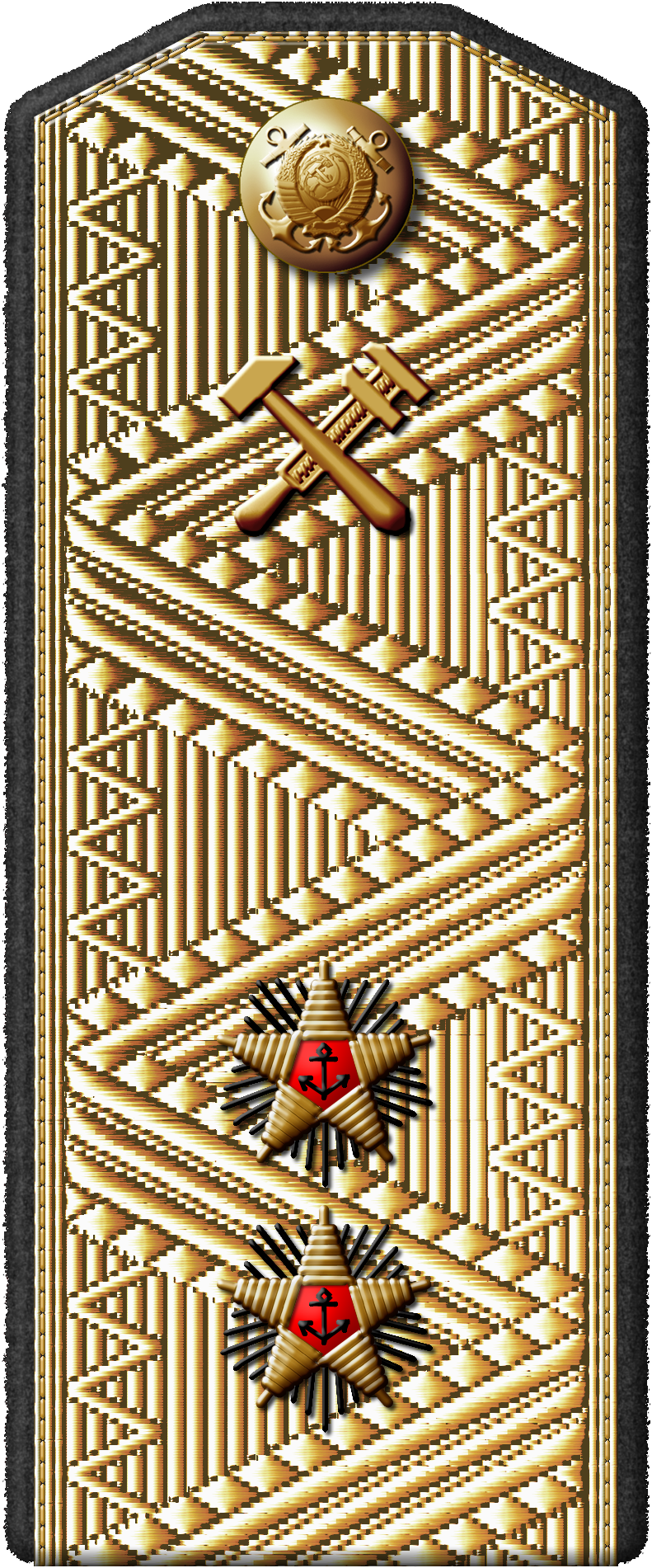
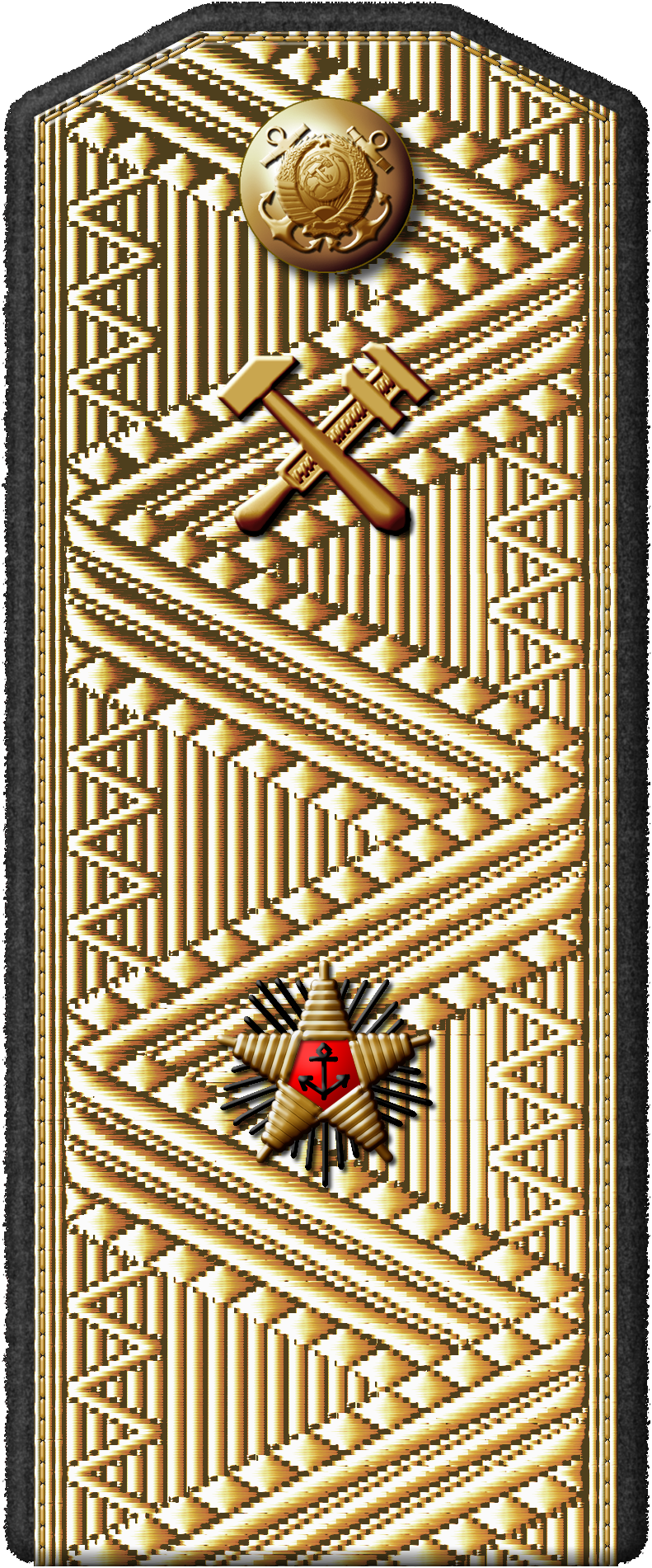
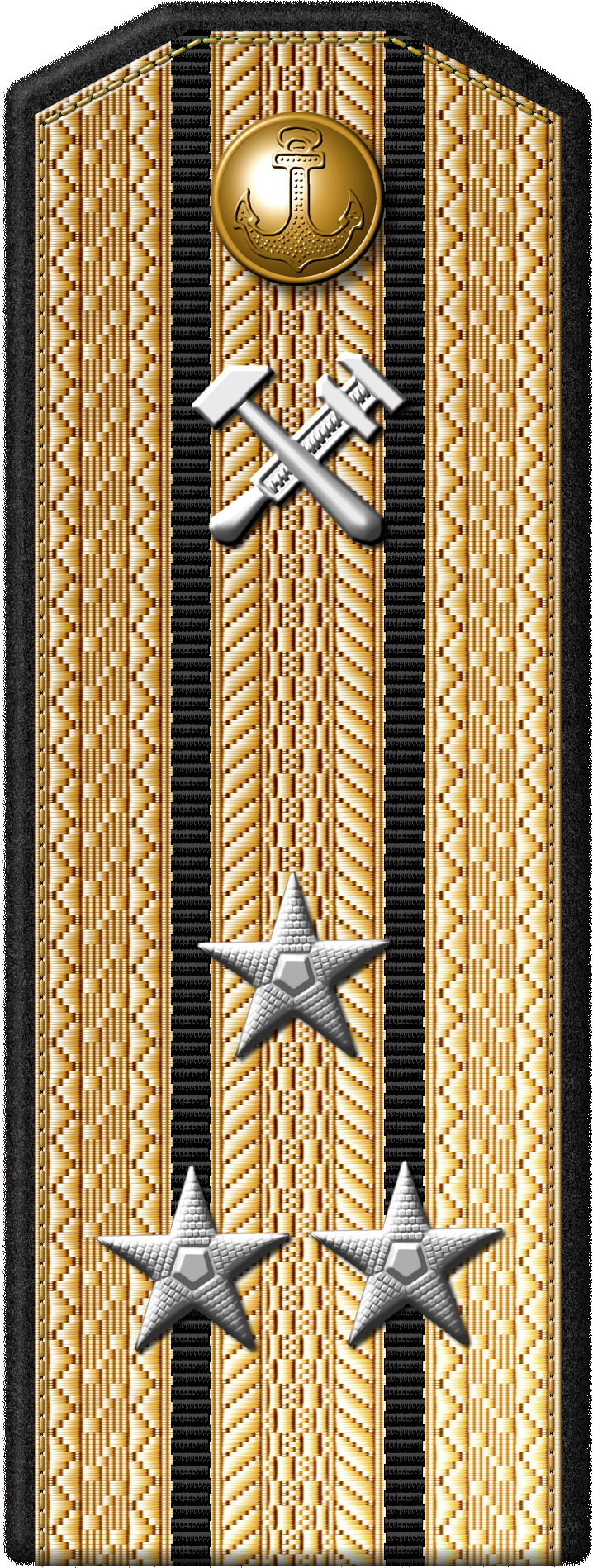
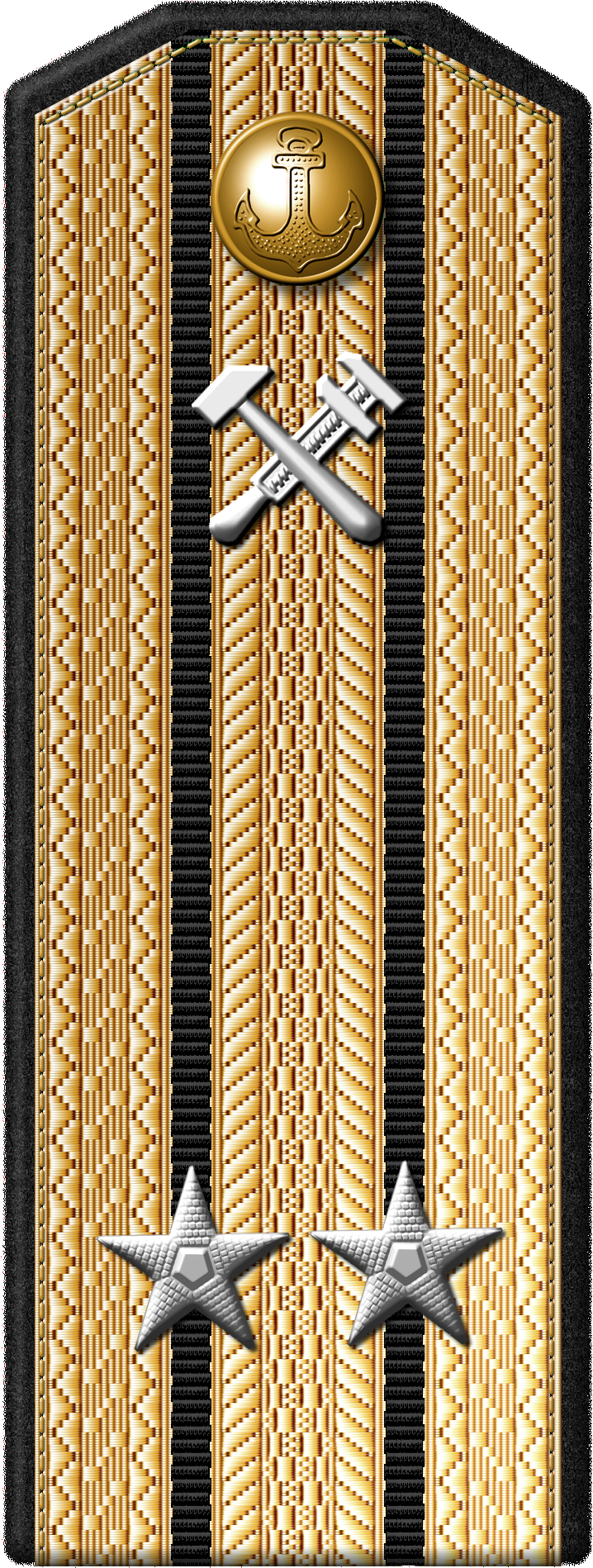
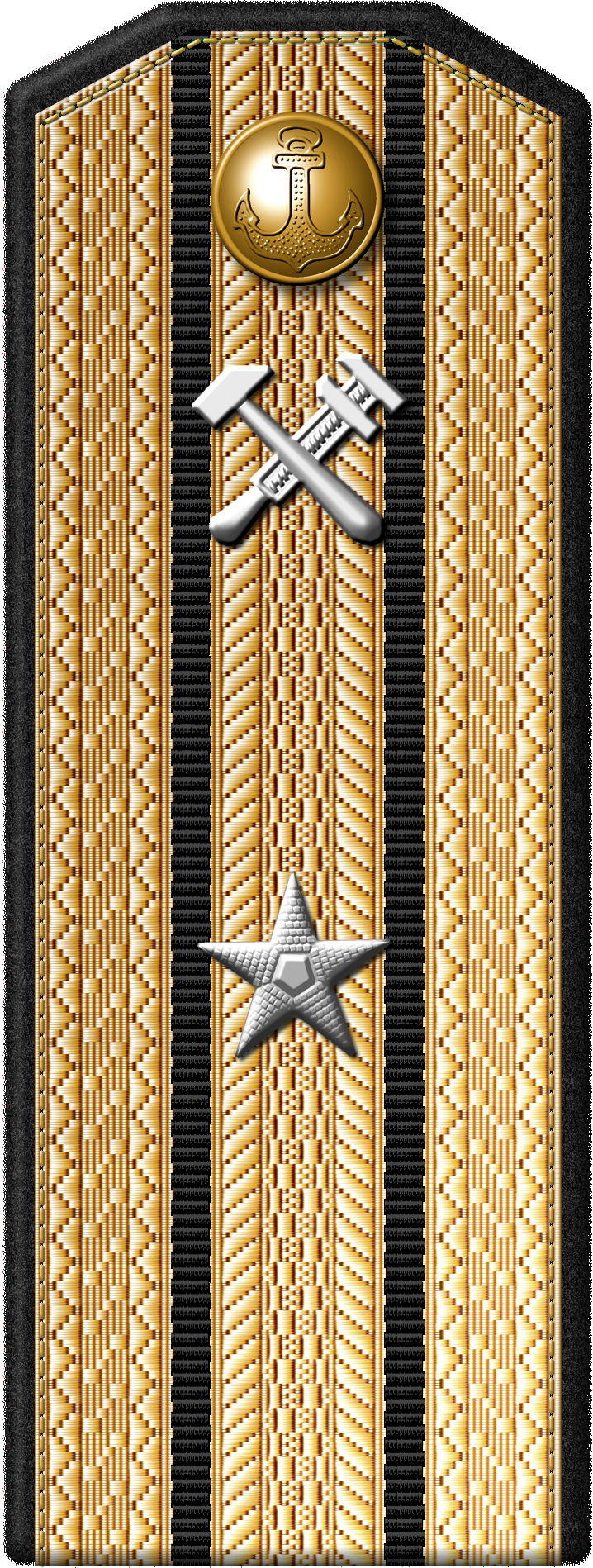
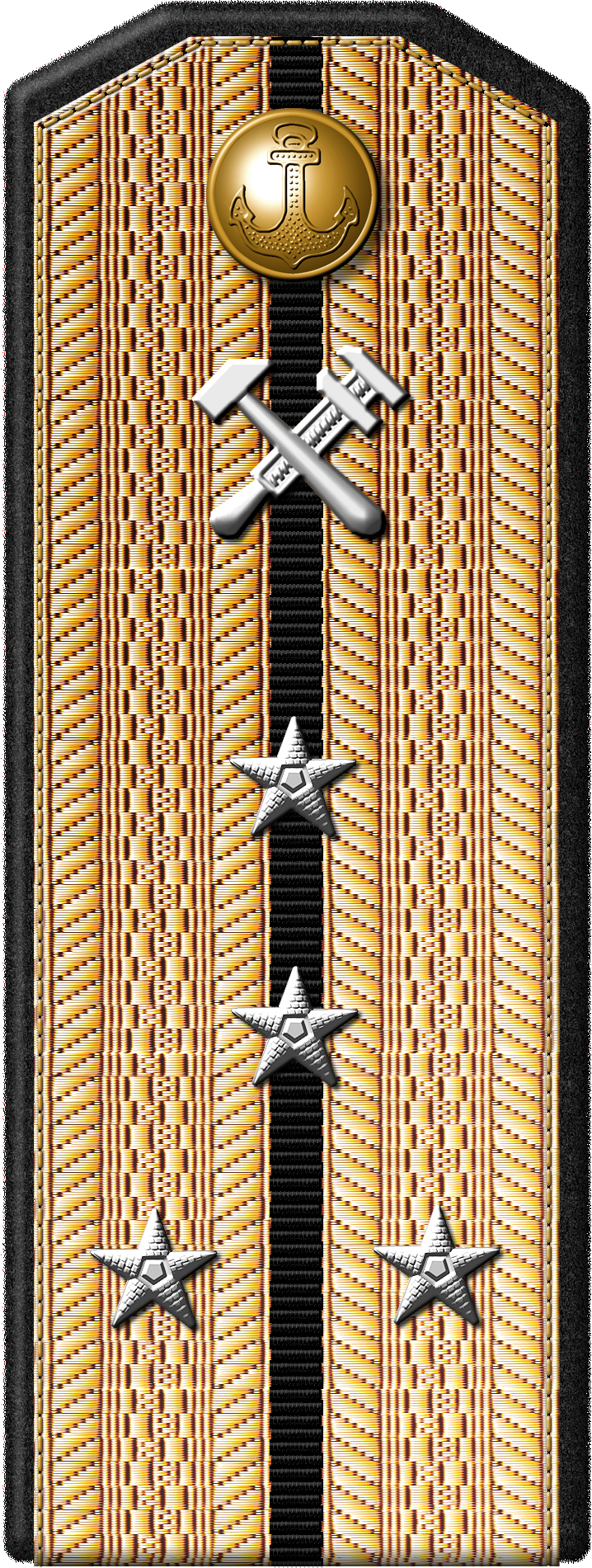
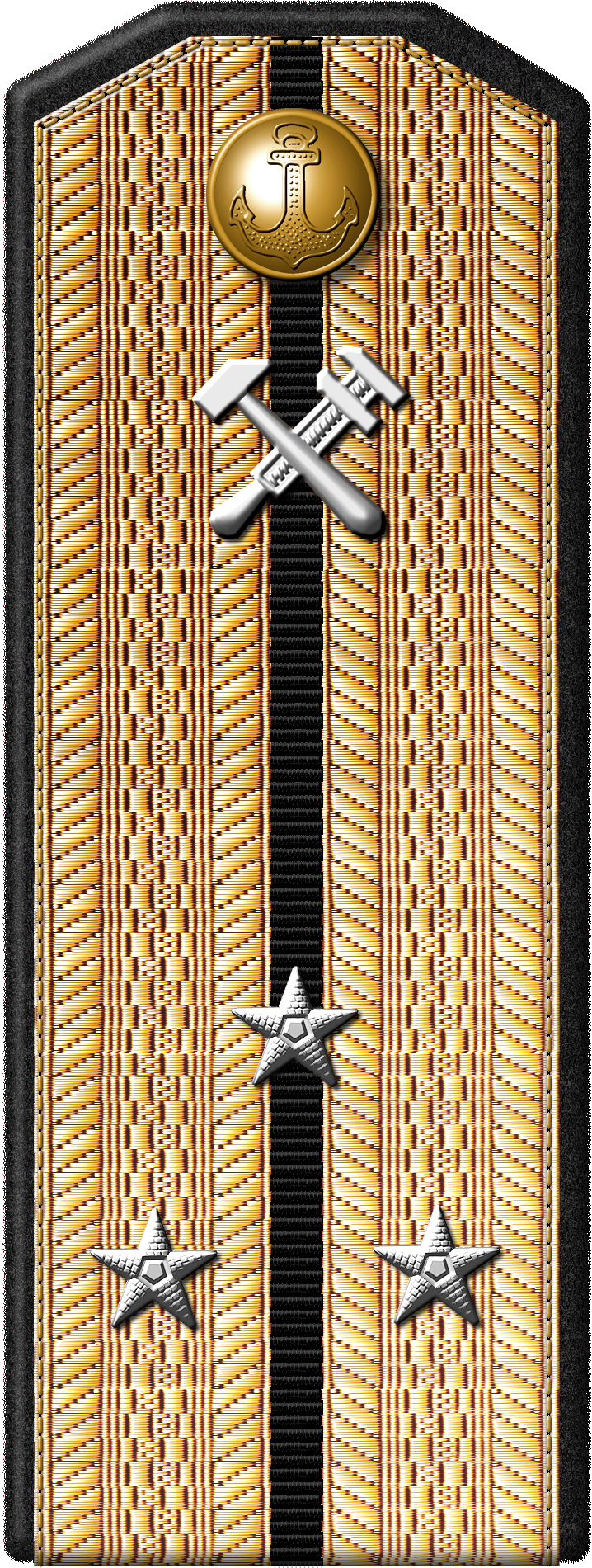
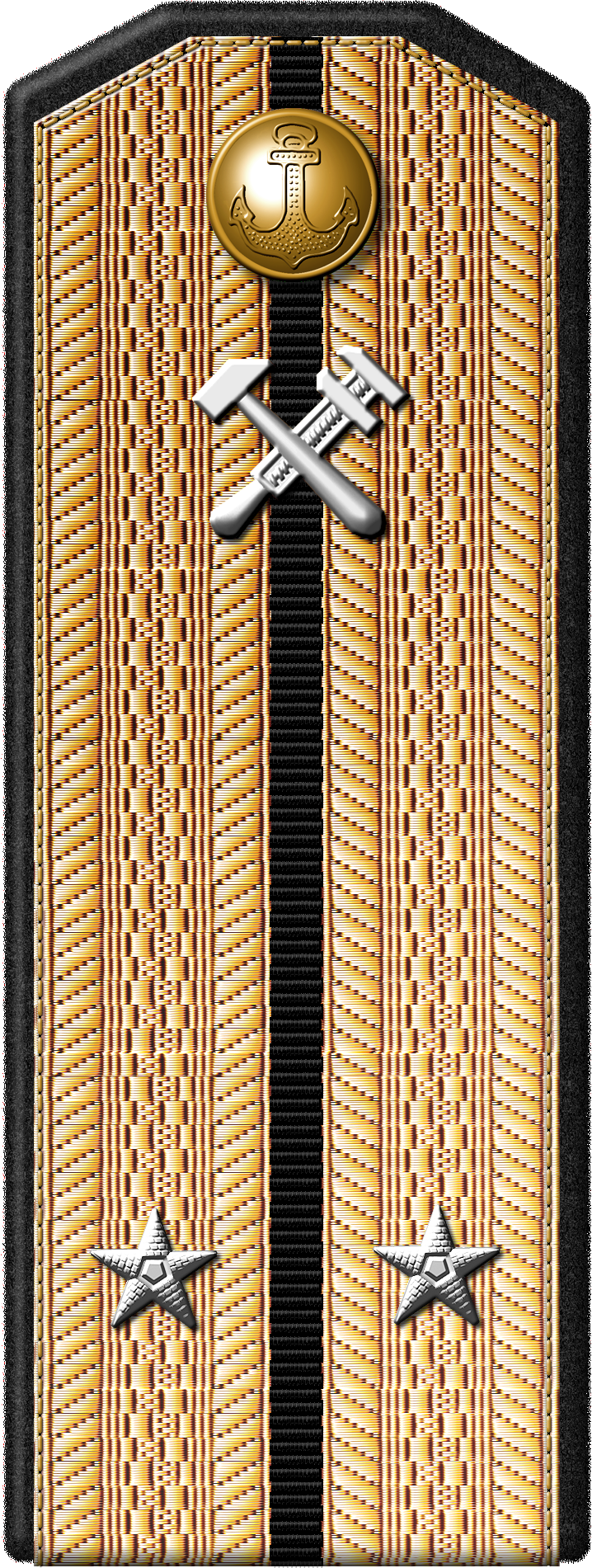
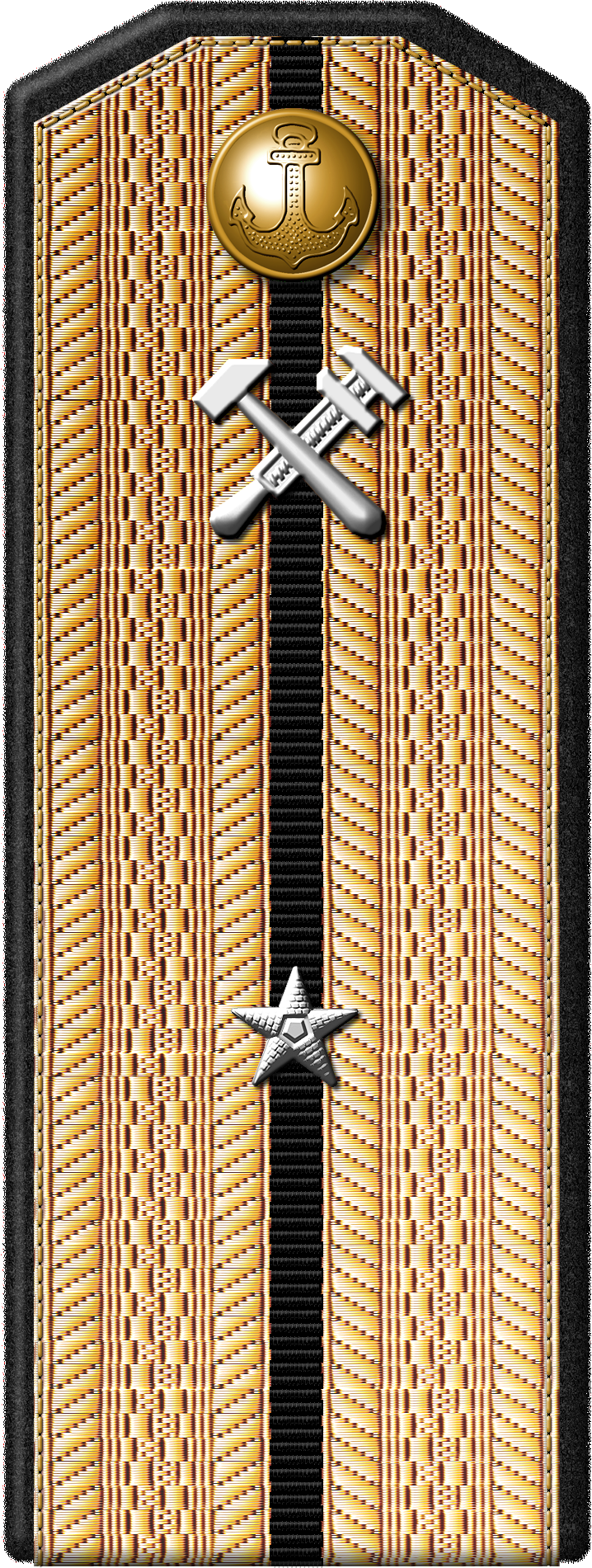
Rank group	General / flag officers					Senior officers			Junior officers
Shoulder insignia
Regular	(1945–1955)	(1943–1945)
Engineers	(1945–1955)	(1943–1945)
Sleeve insignia
All
	Адмирал флота Admirál flota		Адмирал; Admirál	Вице-адмирал; Vitse-admirál	Контр-адмирал; Contre-admirál	Капитан 1-го ранга Kapitan 1-go ránga	Капитан 2-го ранга Kapitan 2-go ránga	Капитан 3-го ранга Kapitan 3-go ránga	Капитан-лейтенант; Kapitan-leytenánt	Старший лейтенант Starshey leytenánt	Лейтенант; Leytenánt	Младший лейтенант Mladshiy leytenánt
Translation	Admiral of the fleet		Admiral	Vice admiral	Counter admiral	Captain 1st rank	Captain 2nd rank	Captain 3rd rank	Captain lieutenant	Senior lieutenant	Lieutenant	Junior lieutenant

=== Naval ratings (naval service) ===
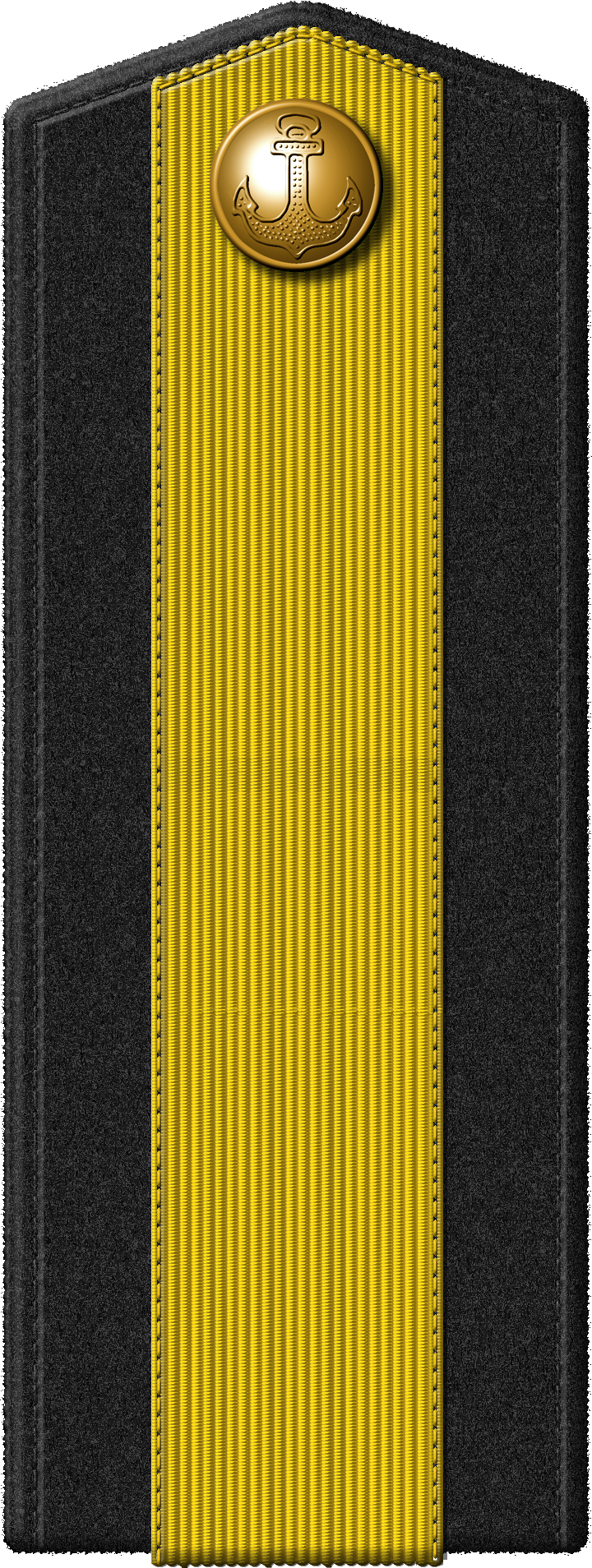
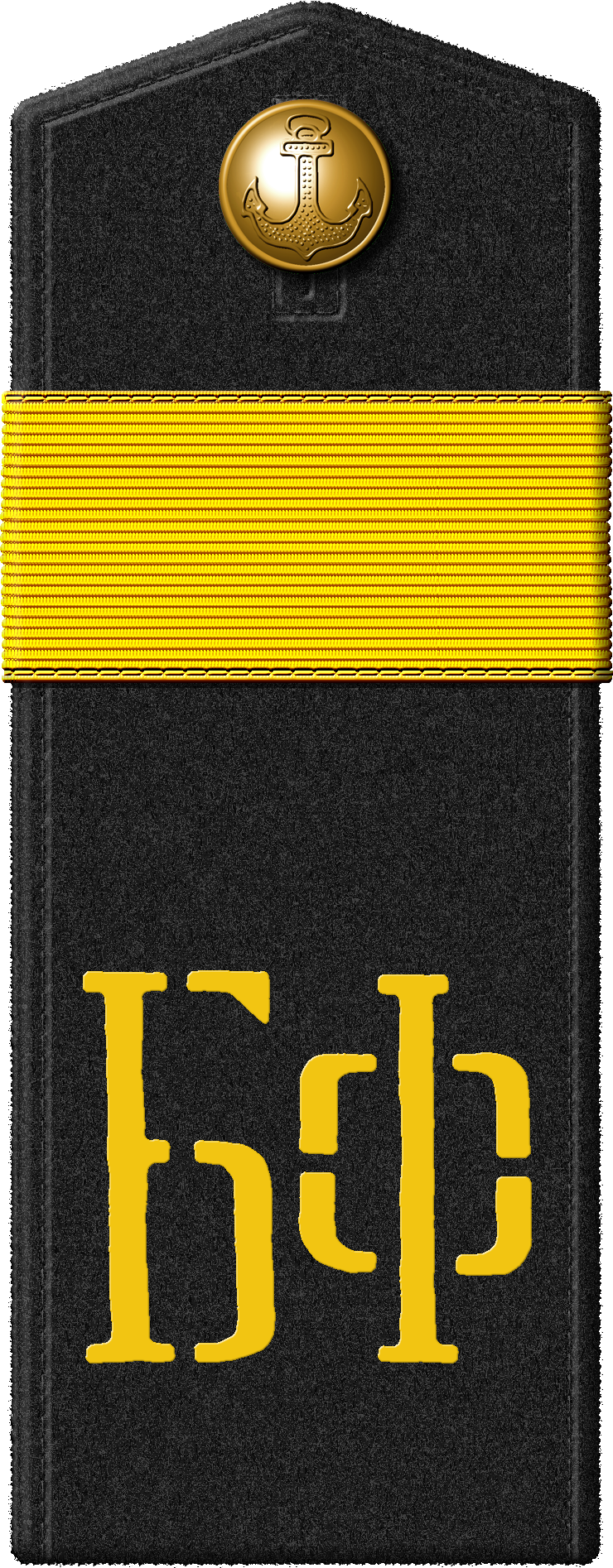
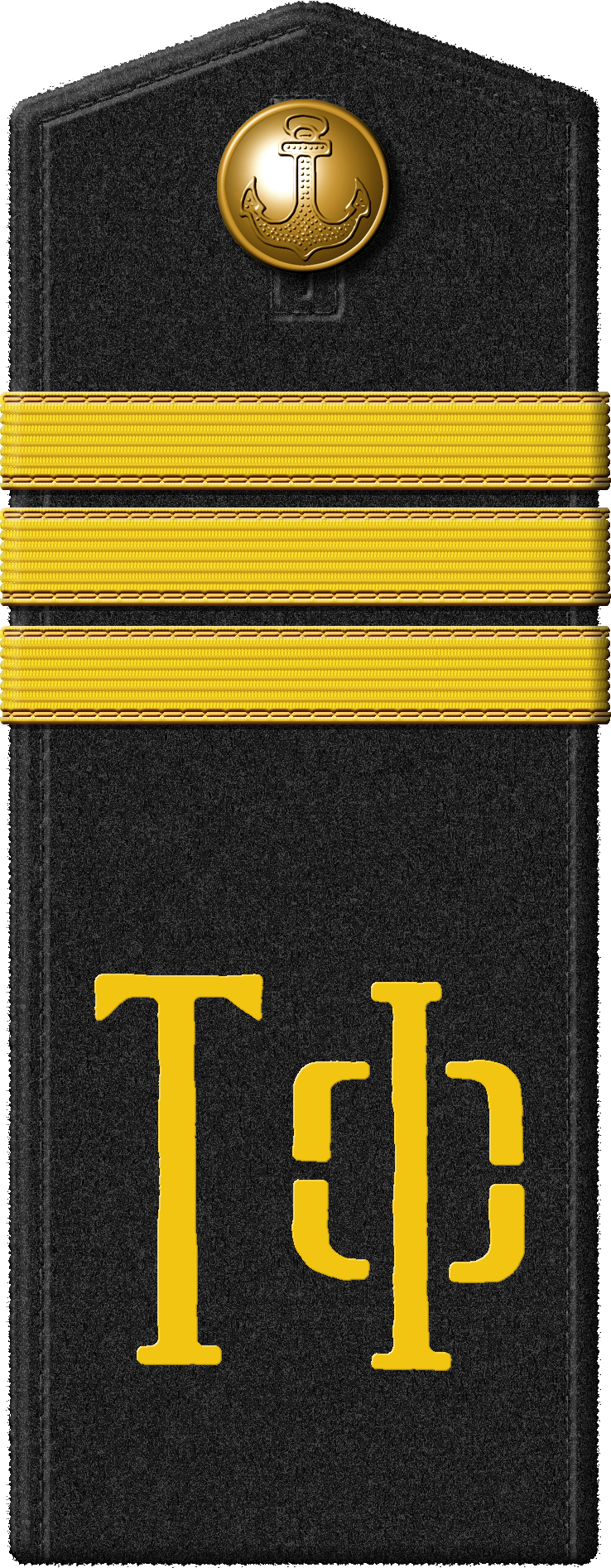
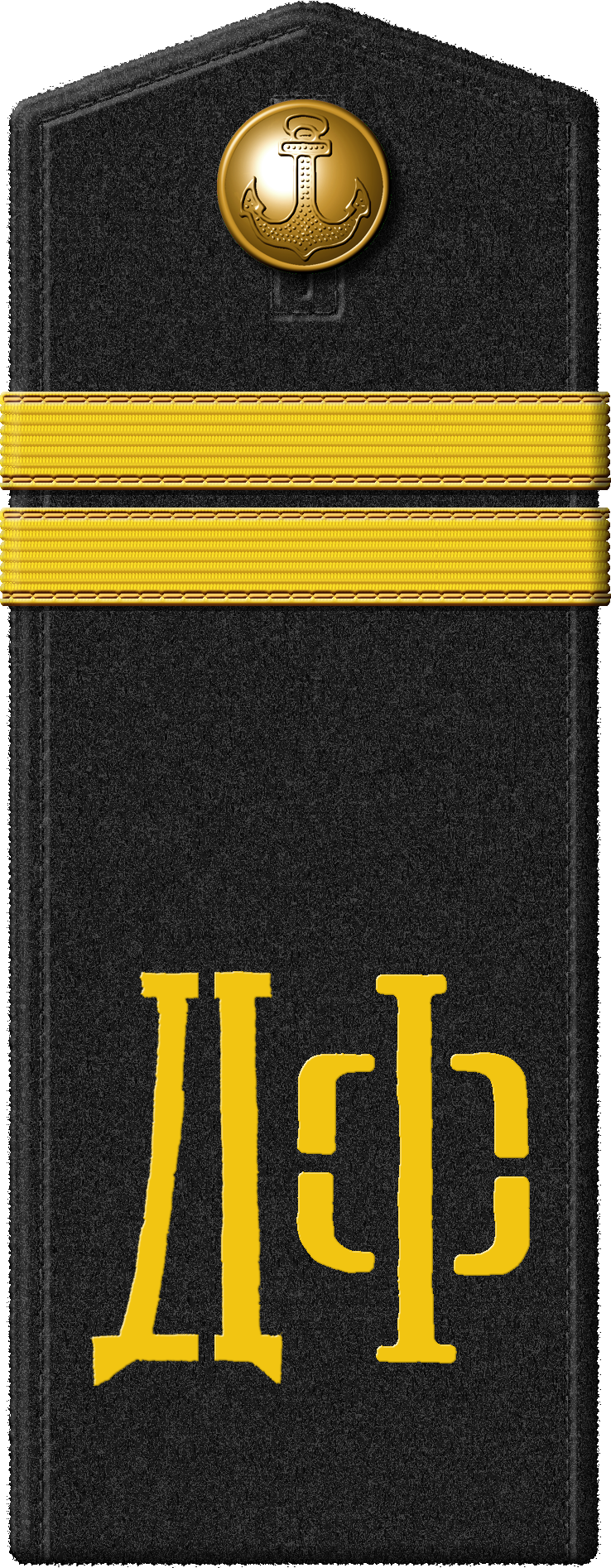
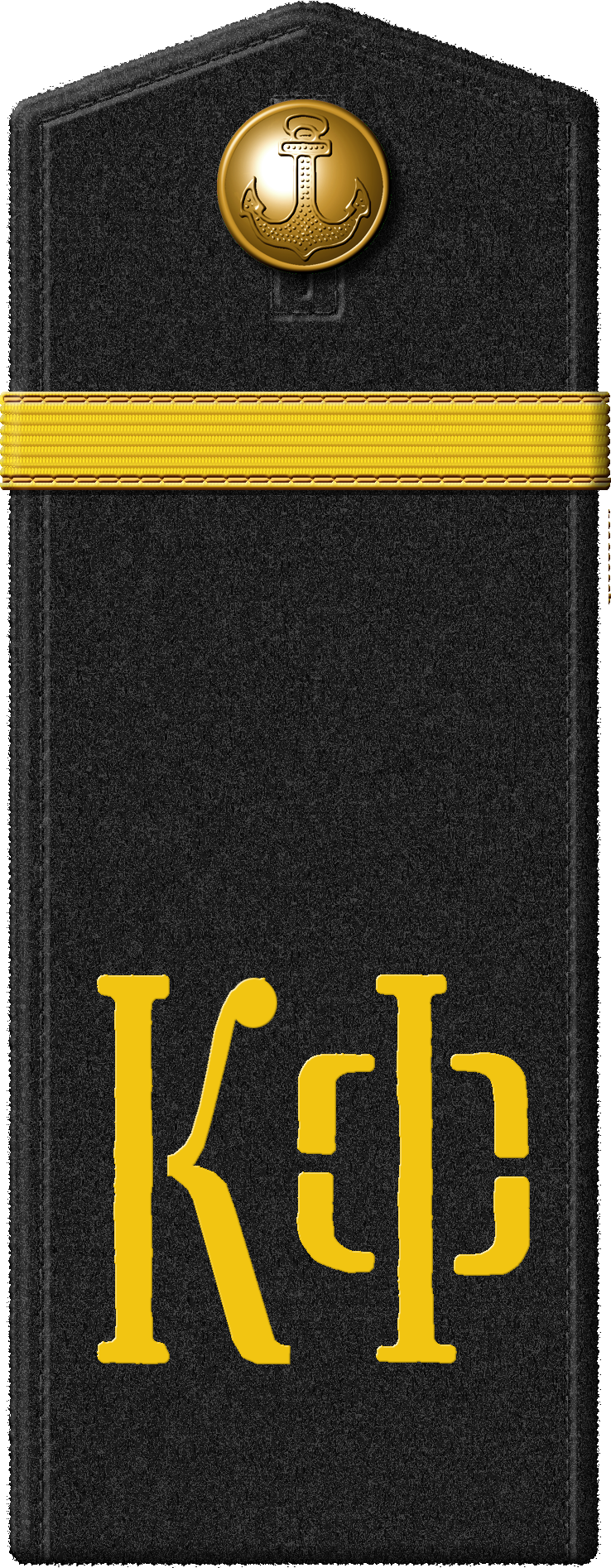
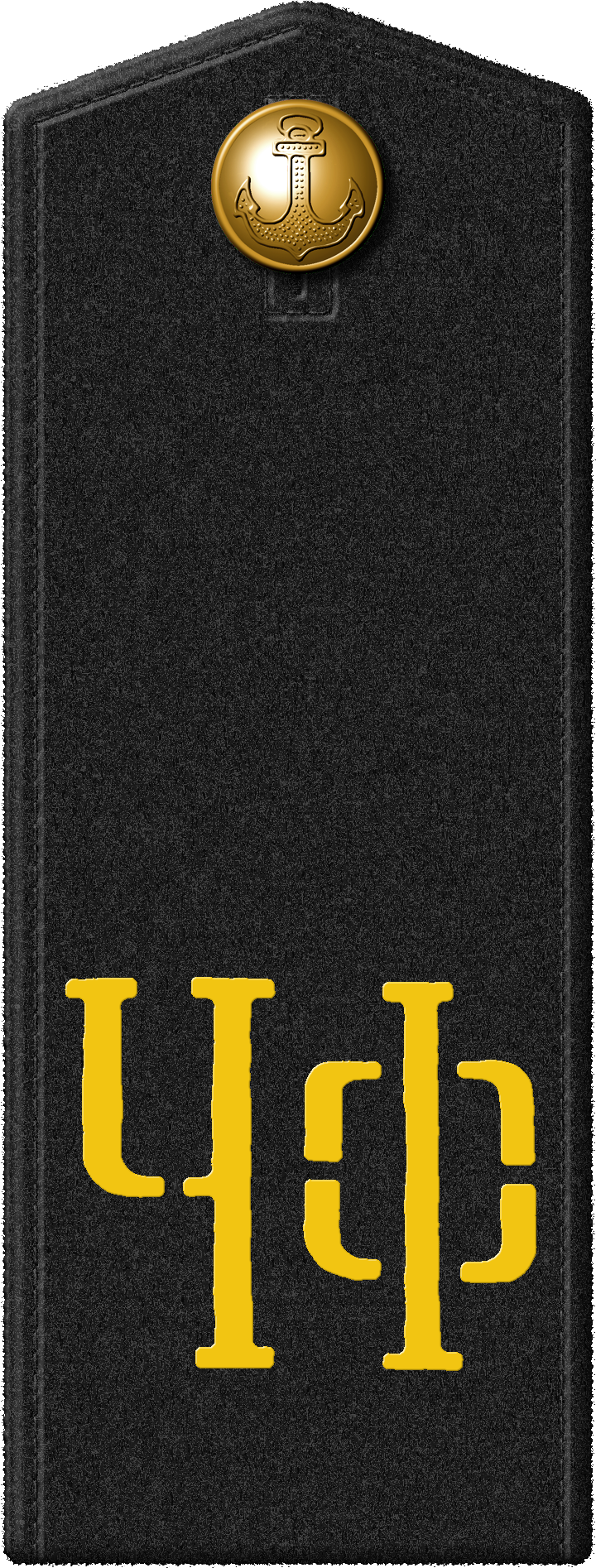
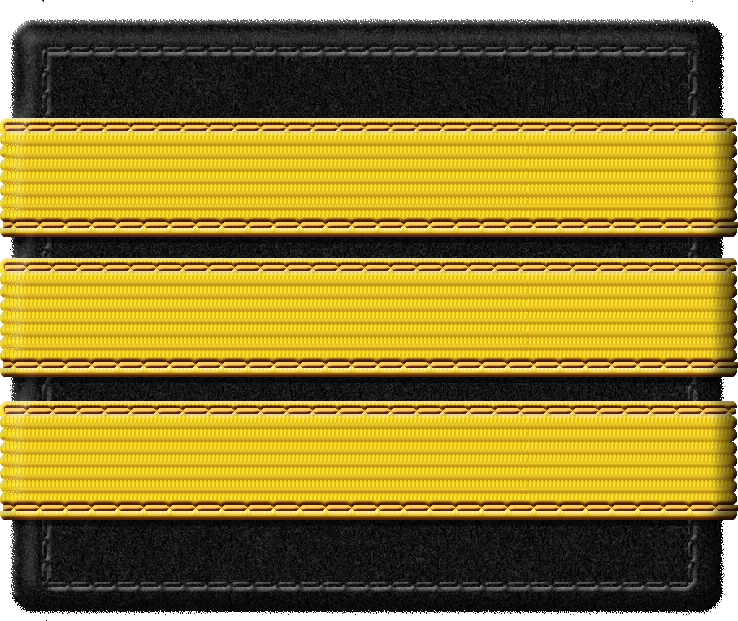
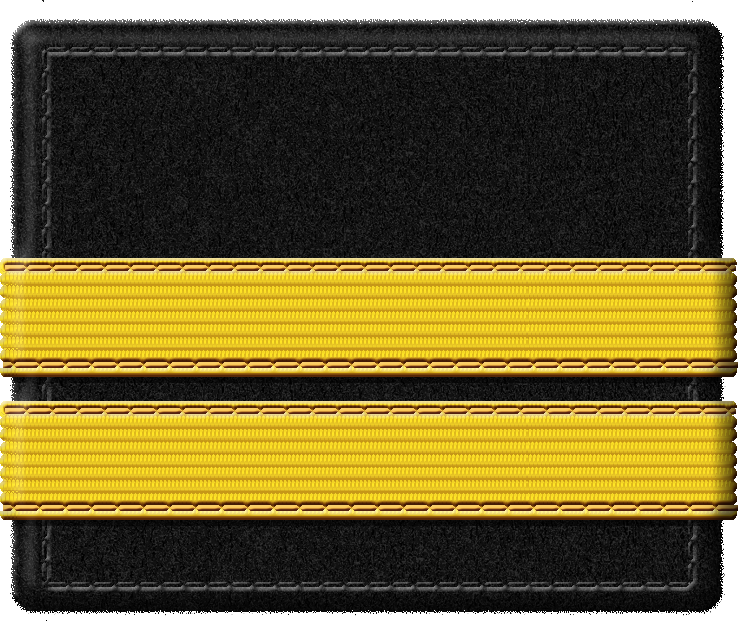
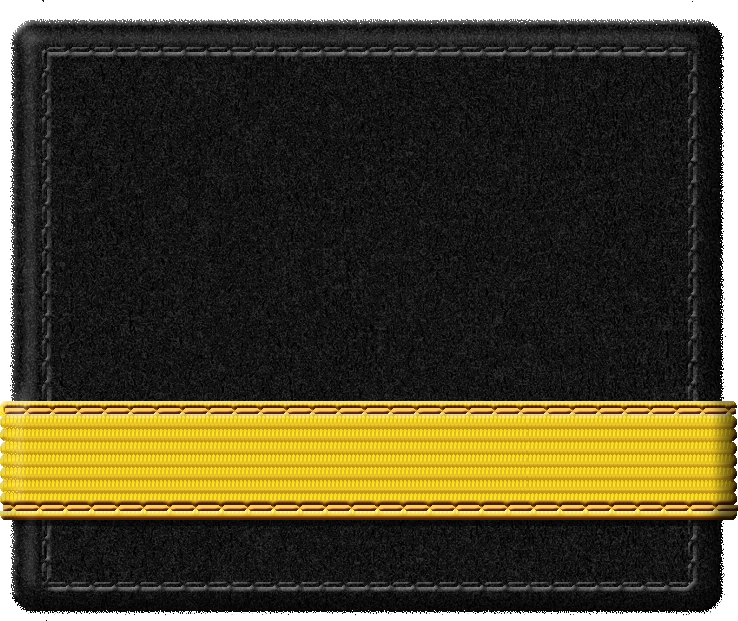
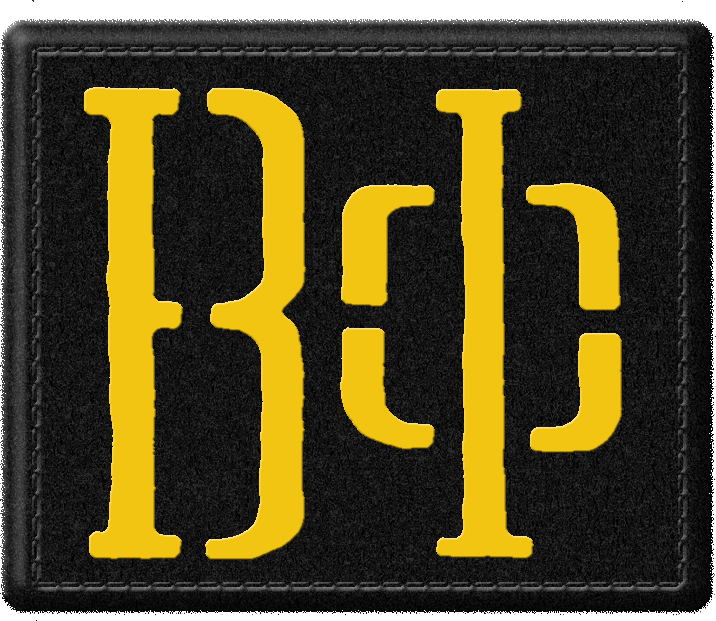
Rank group	Senior ratings				Junior ratings
Shoulder board to service uniform
Shoulder strap to service uniform
	Мичман; Mičman	Главный старшина Glavny starshina	Старшина 1 статьи Starshina 1 statie	Старшина 2 статьи Starshina 2 statie	Старший краснофлотец Starshina krasnoflotets	Краснофлотец; Krasnoflotets

=== Ranks and insignia of naval ground and technical services ===
==== Officers ====
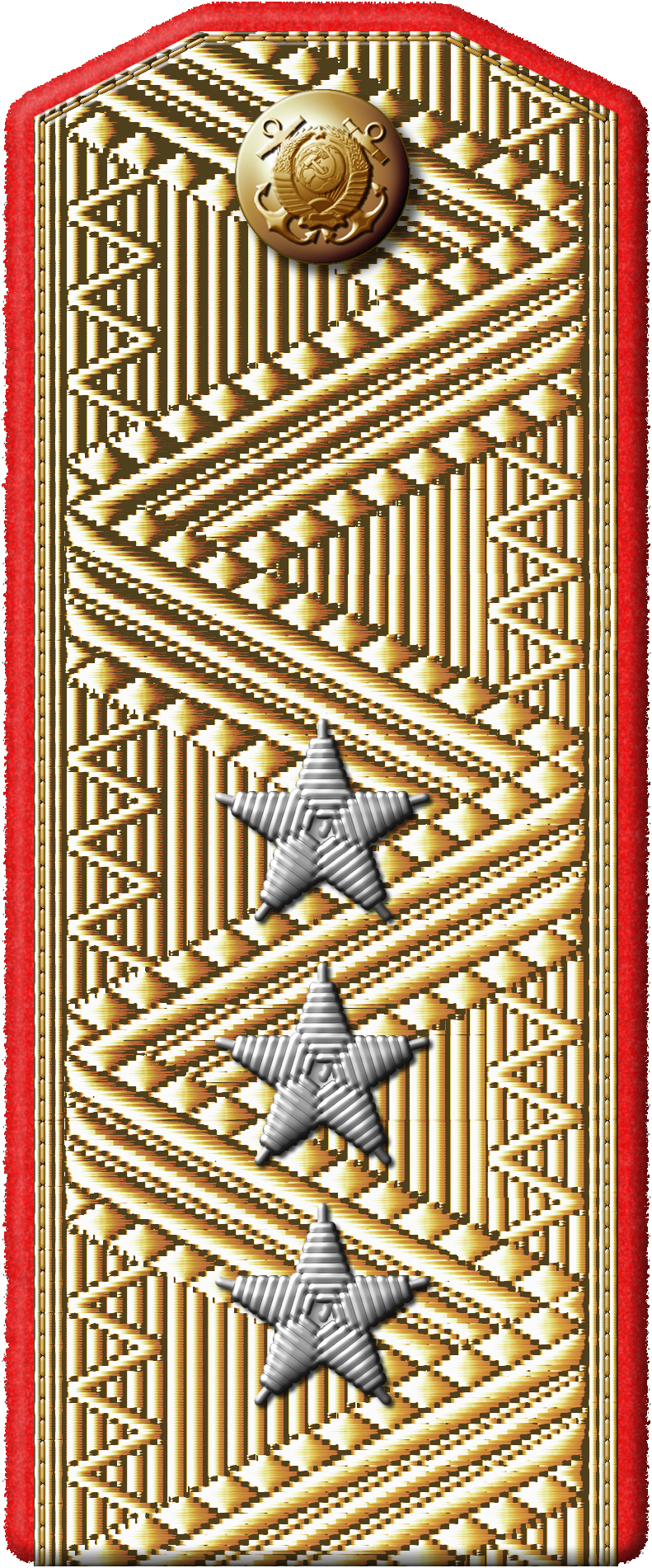
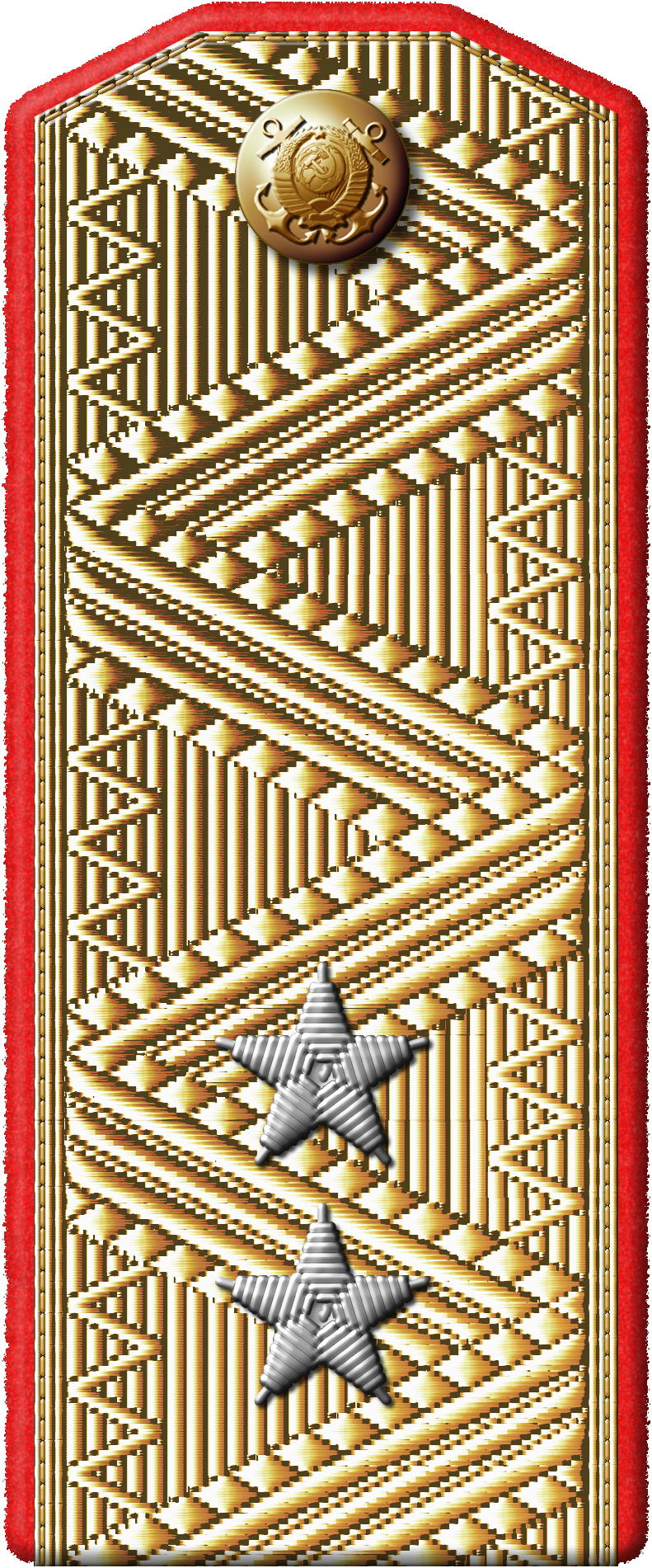
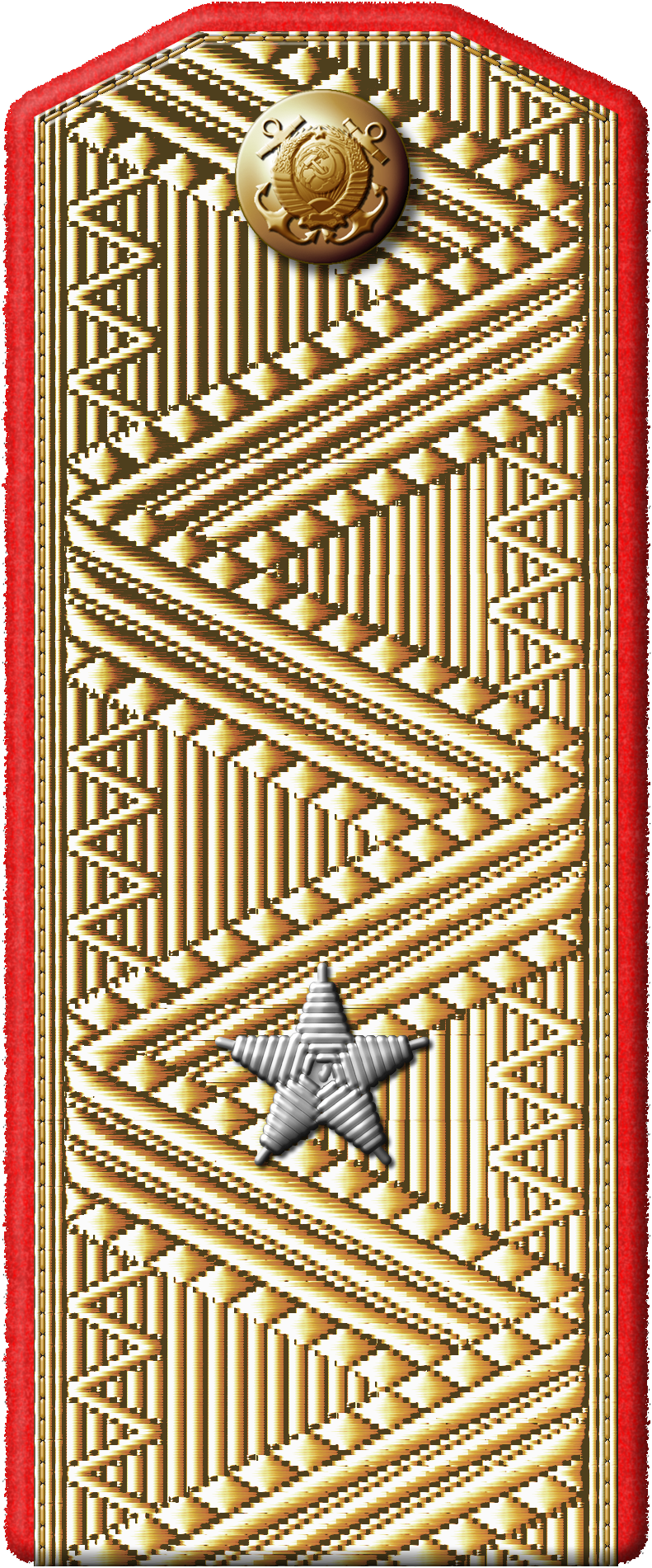
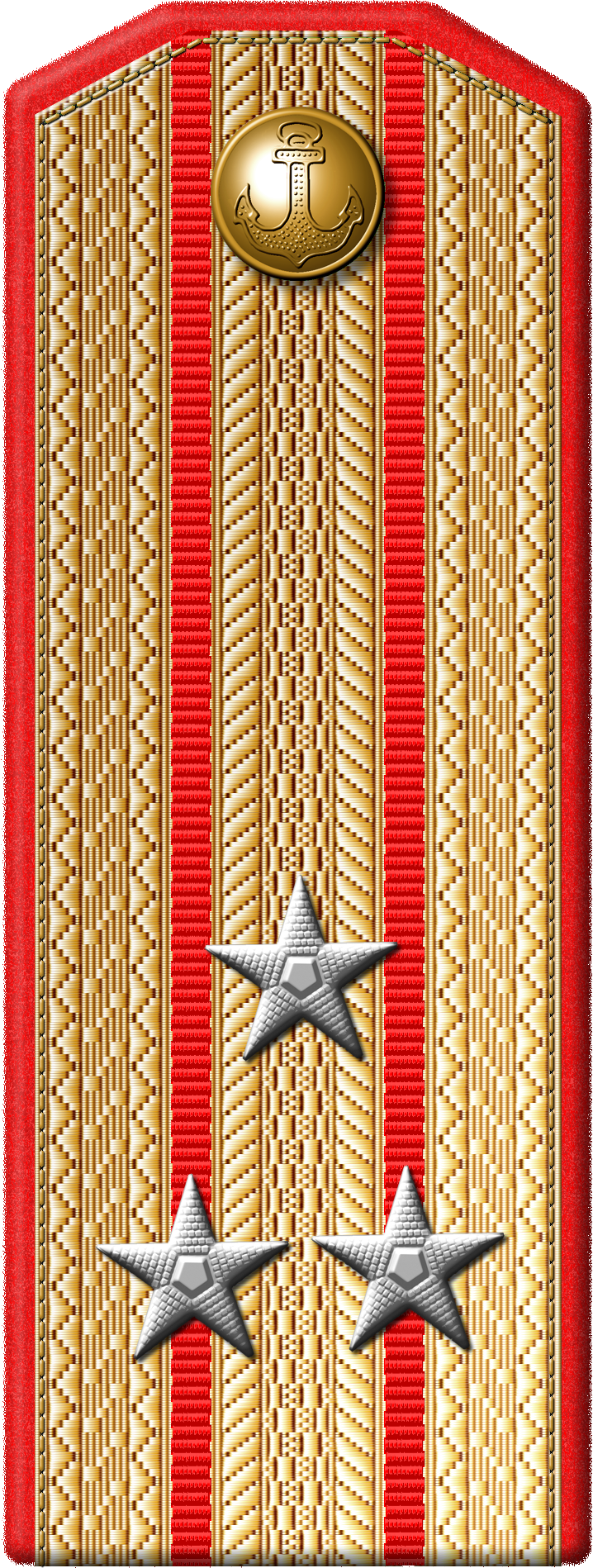
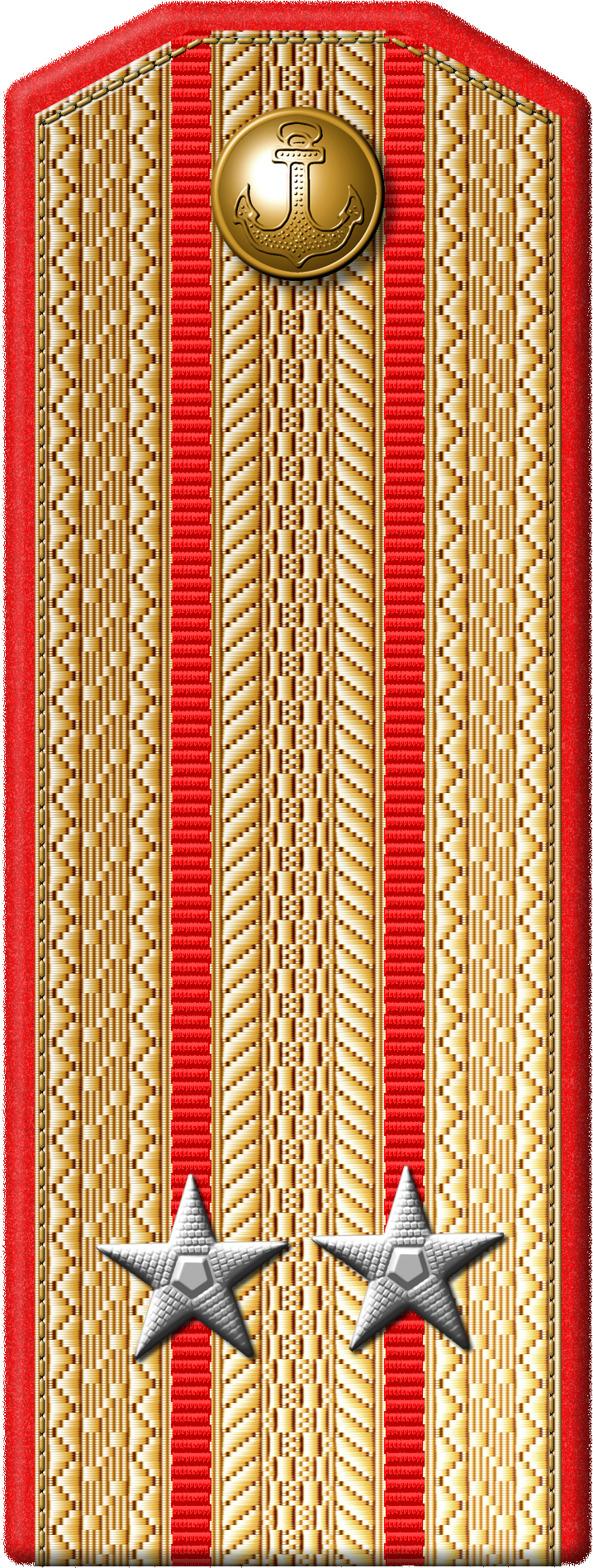
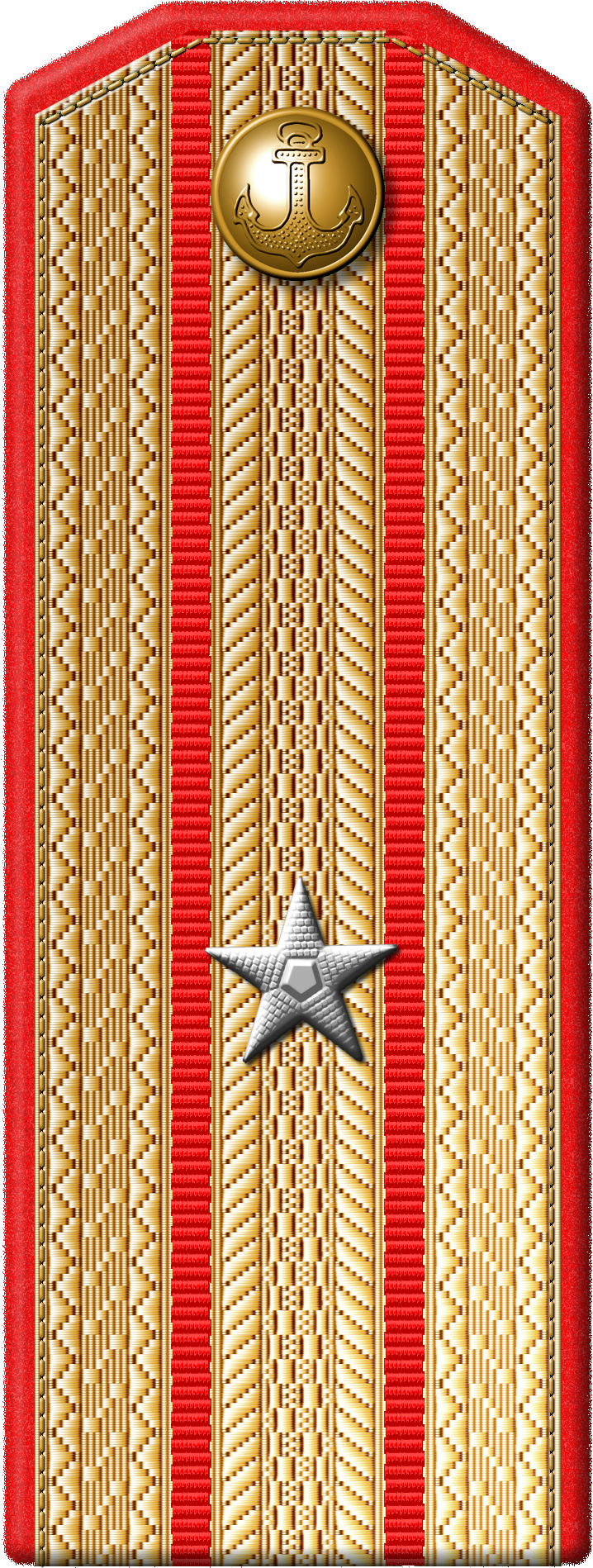
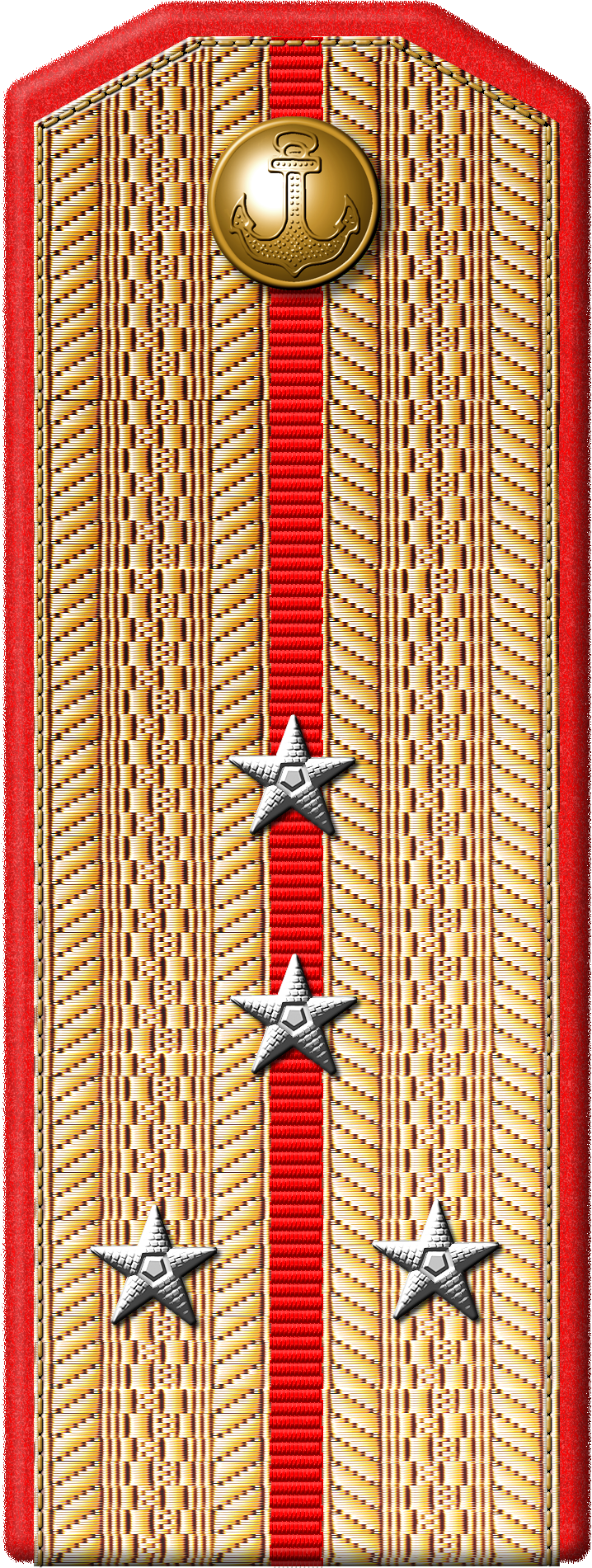
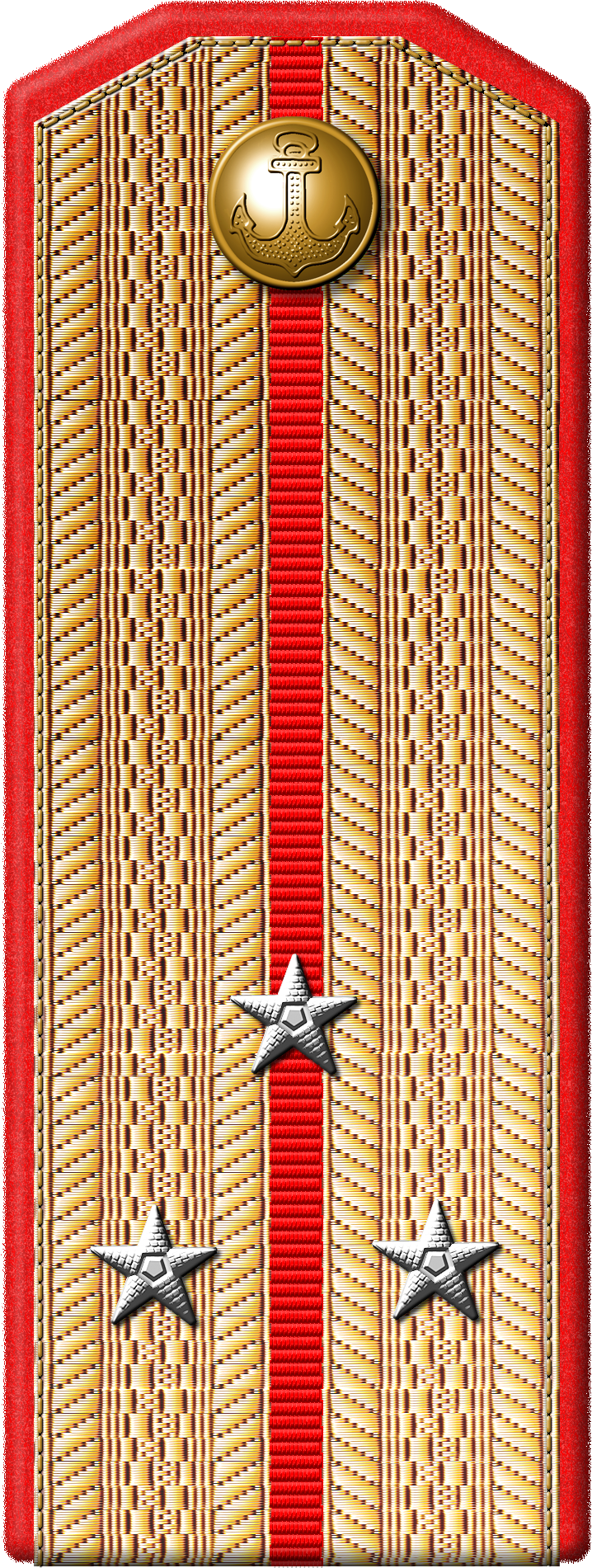
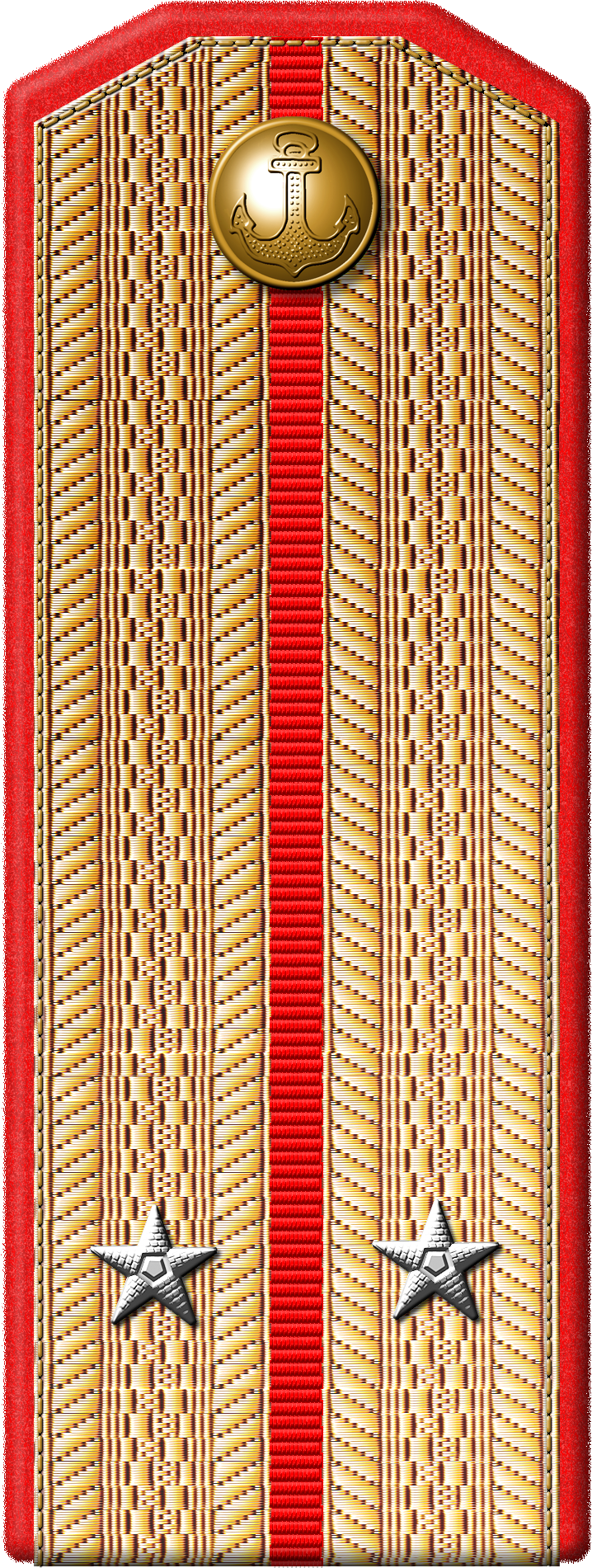
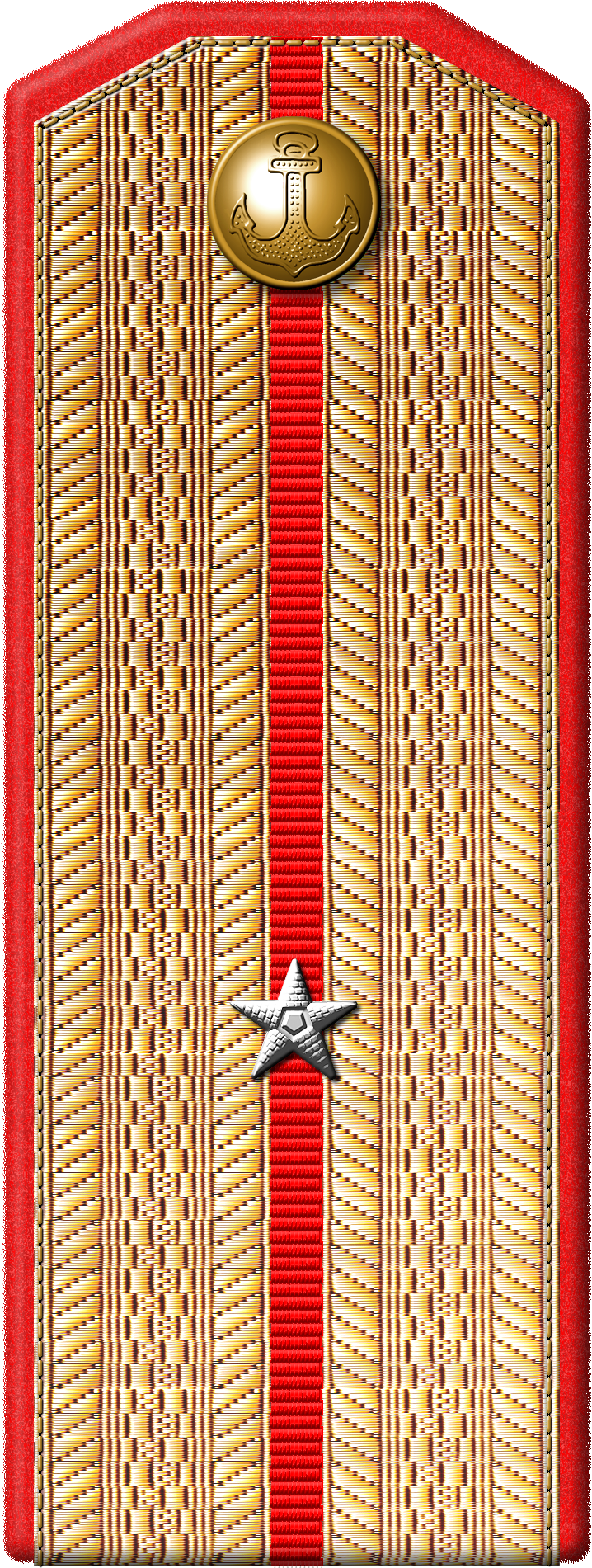
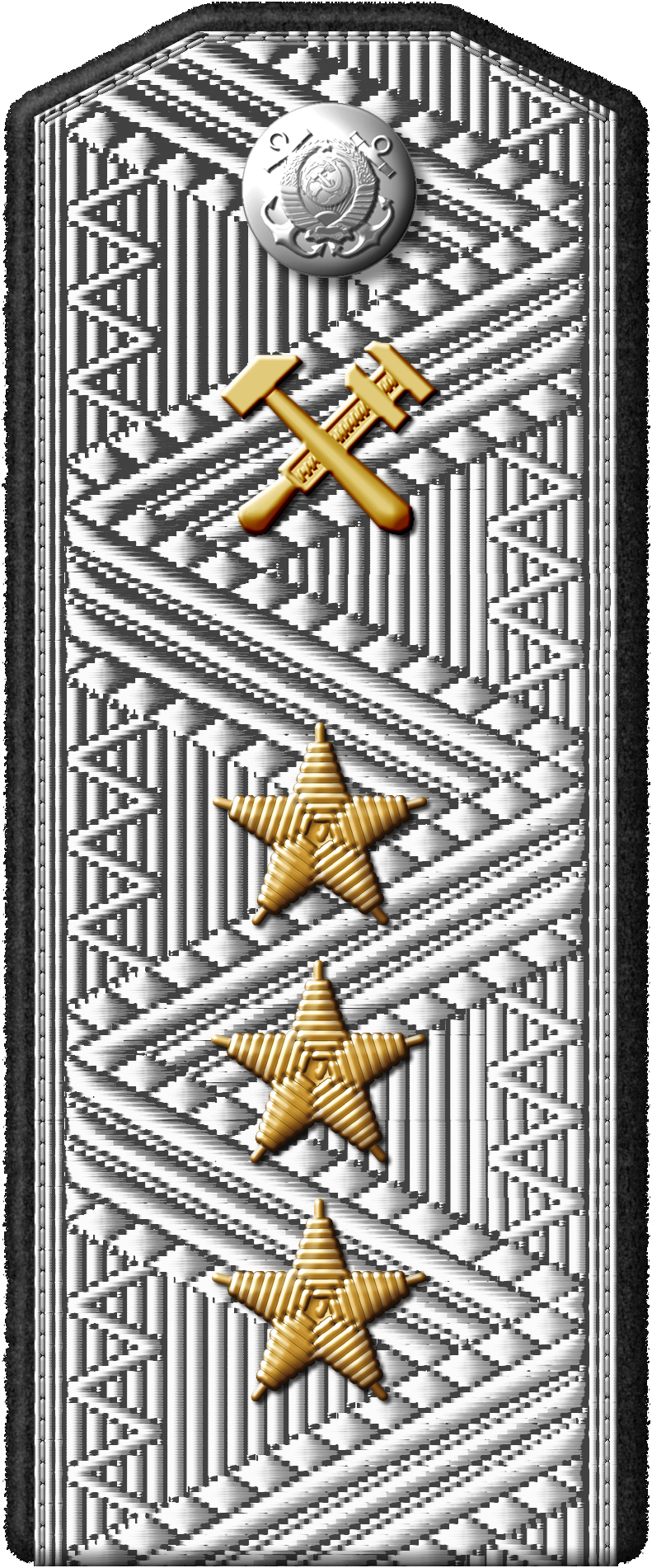
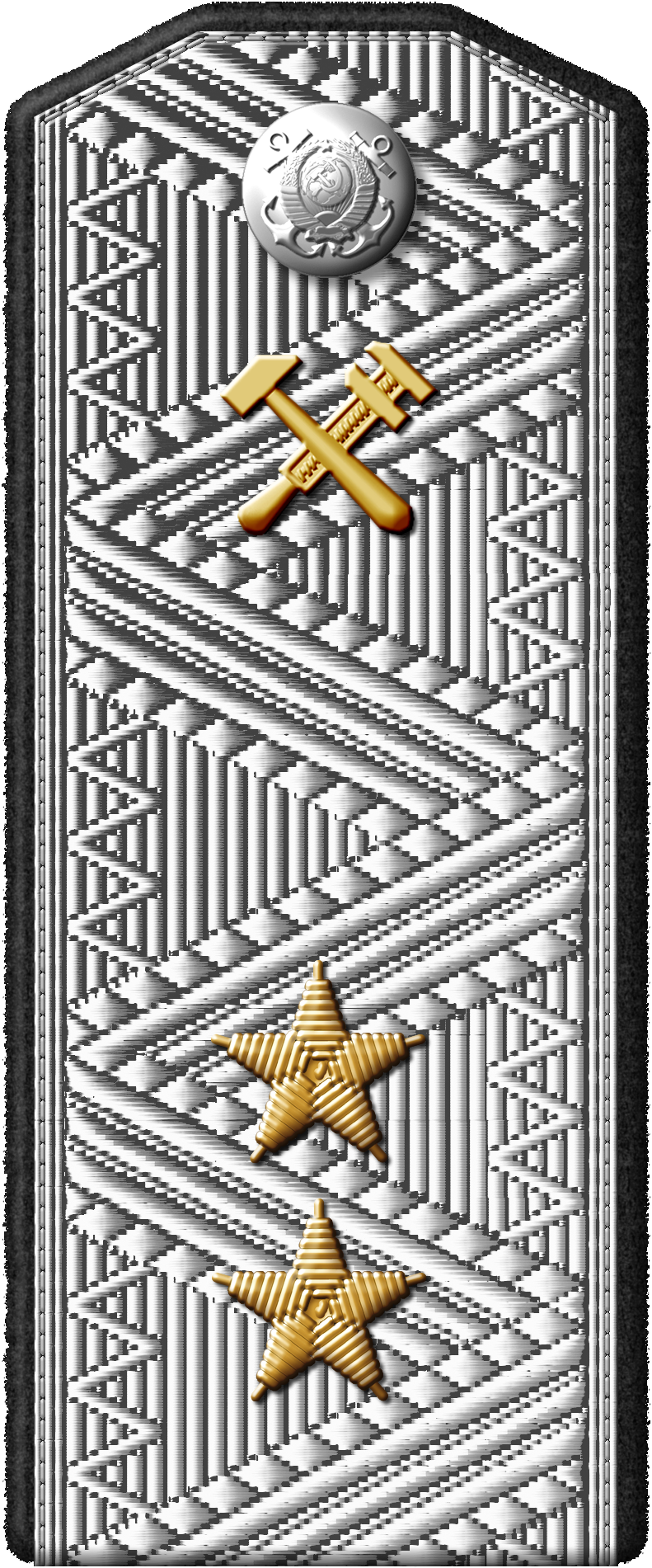
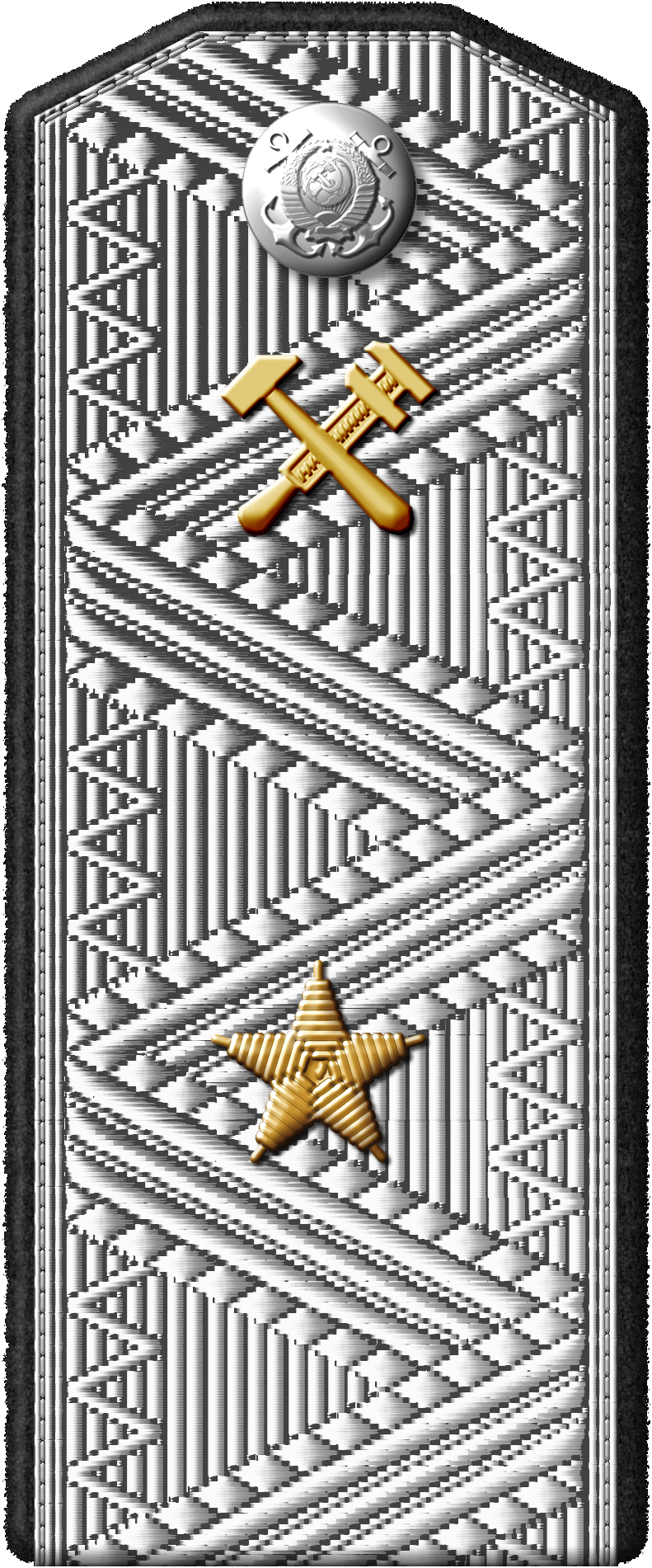
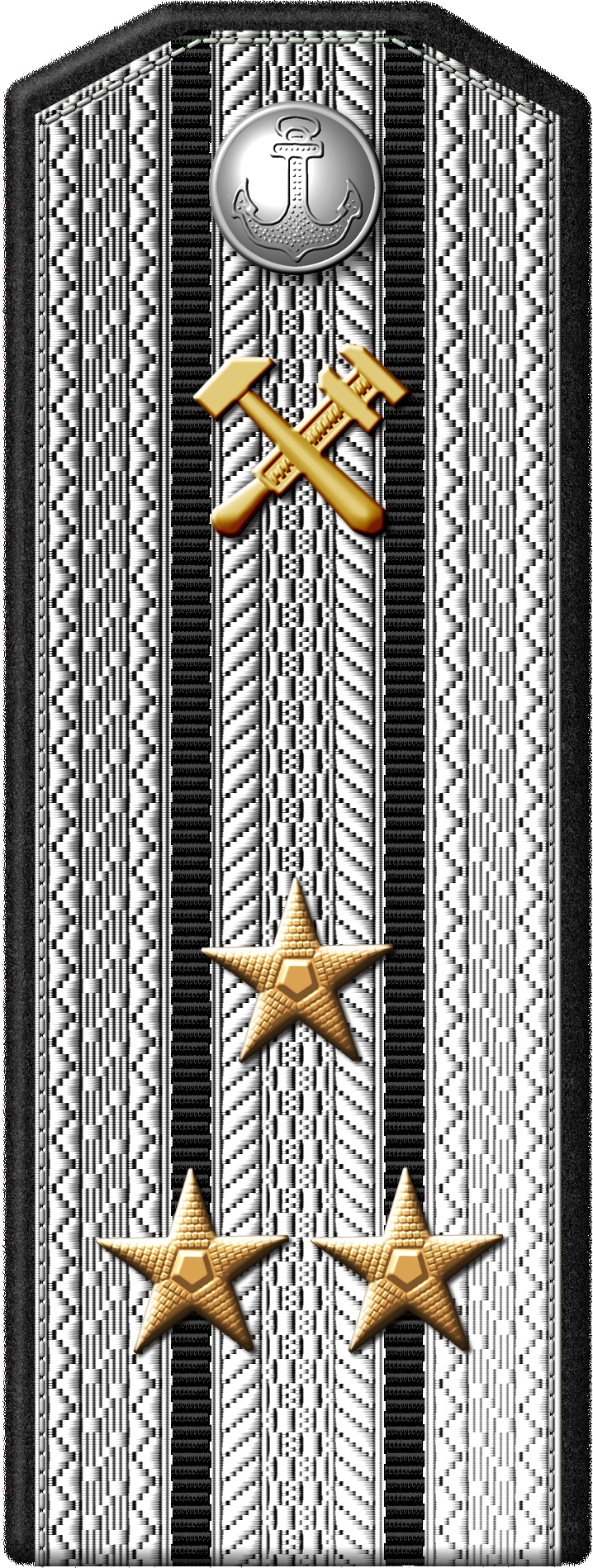
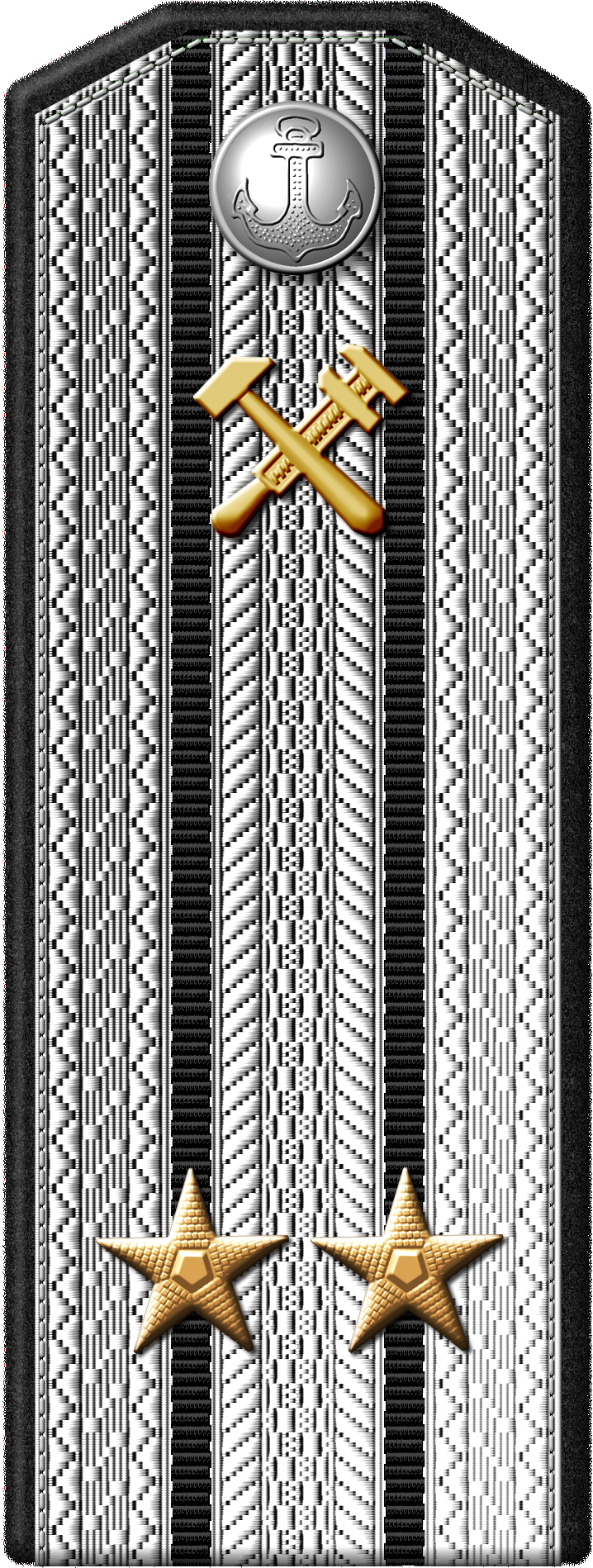
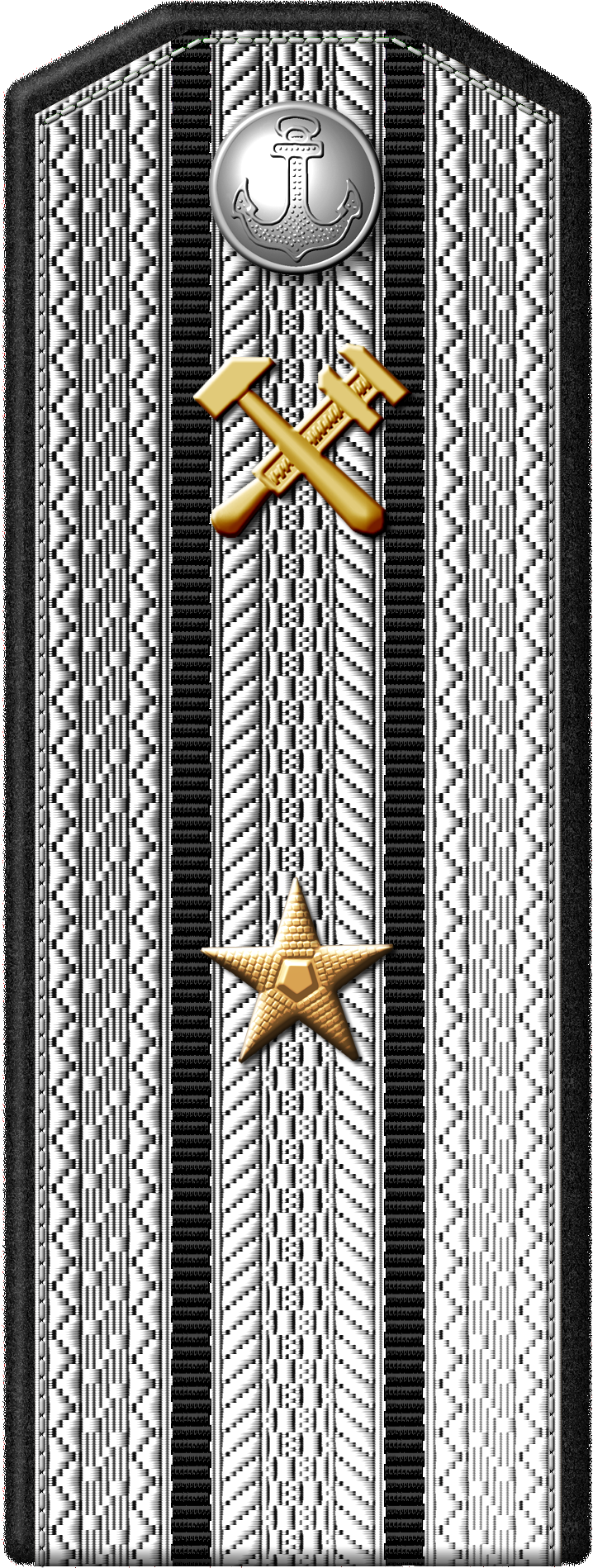
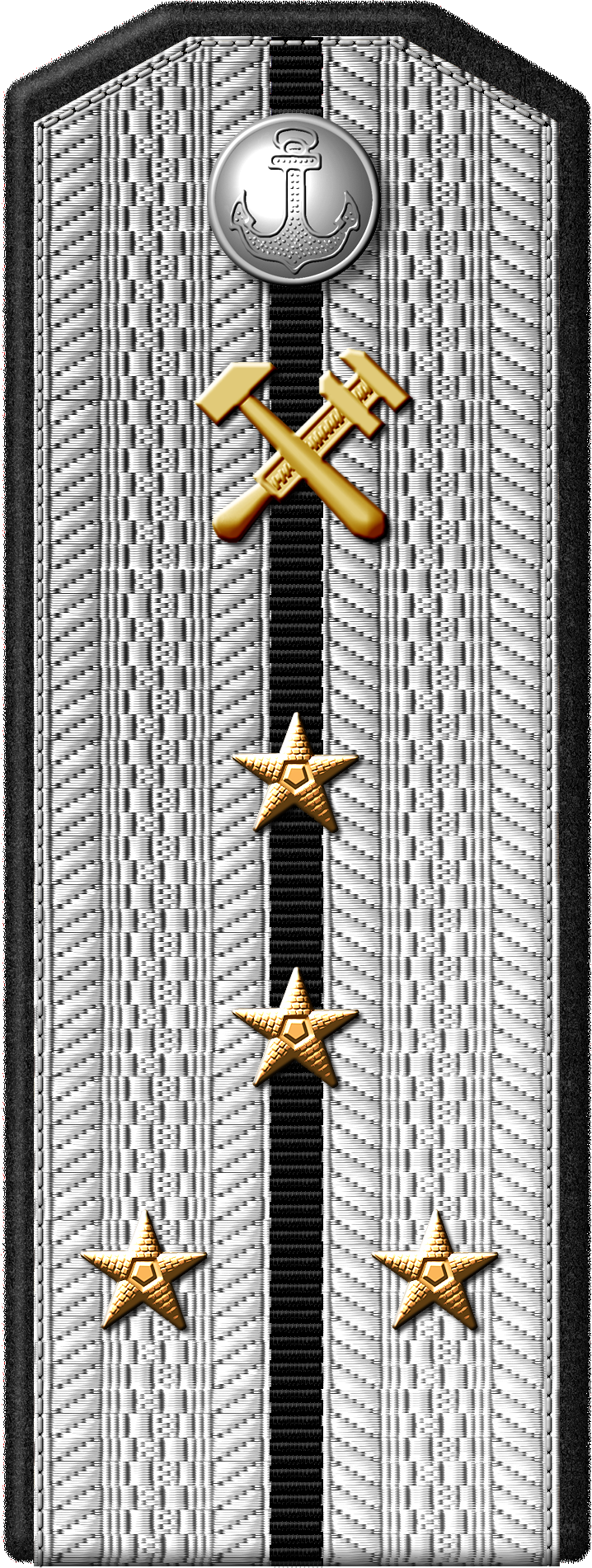
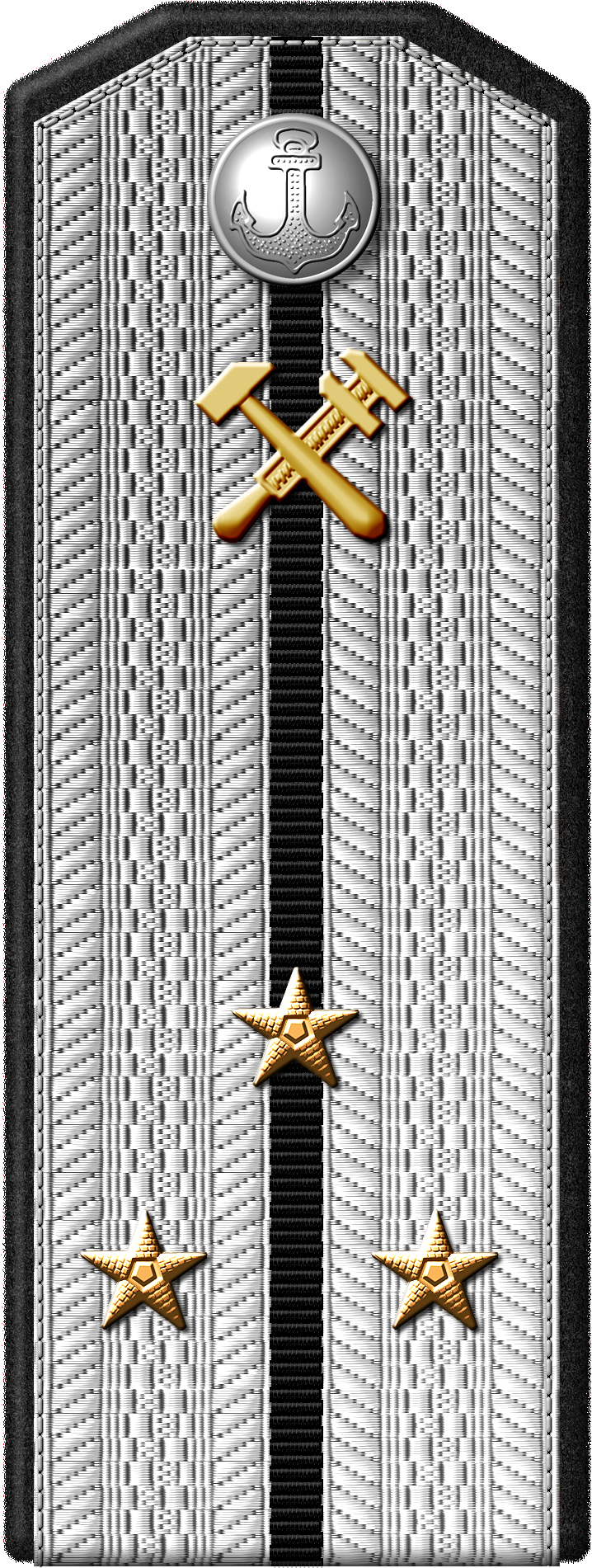
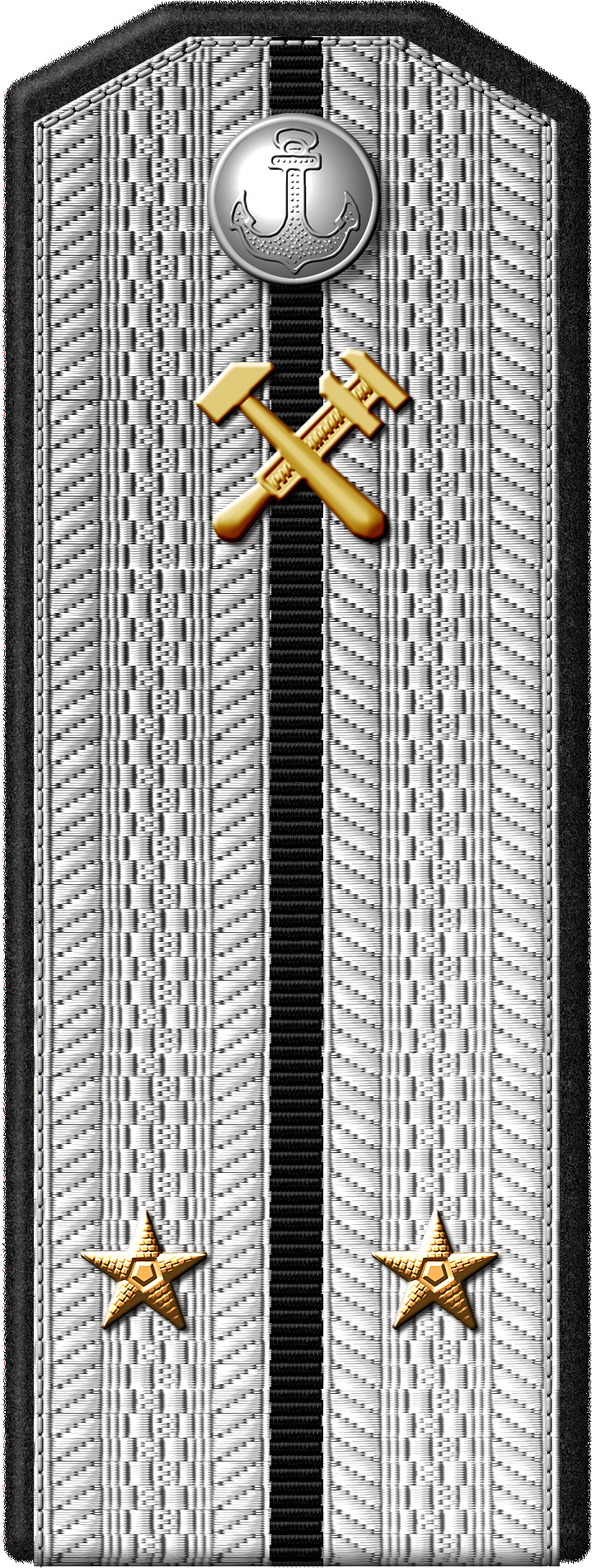
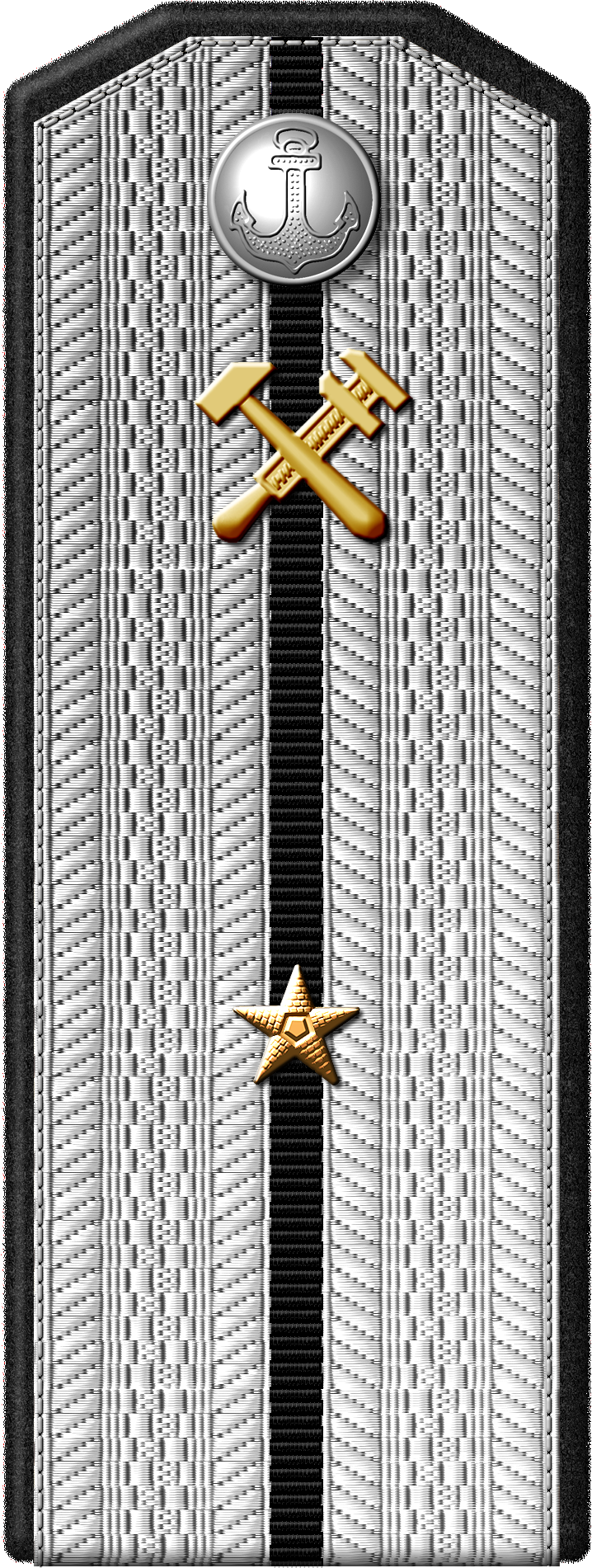
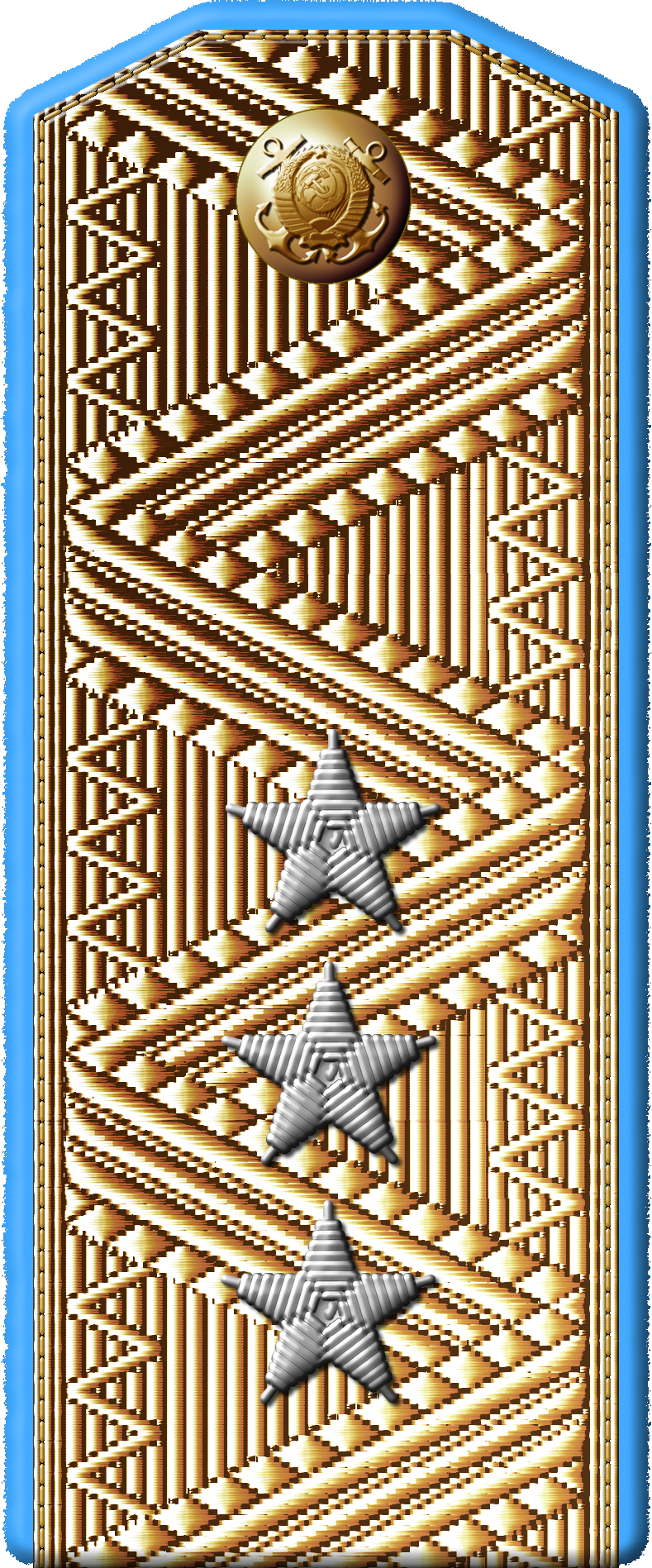
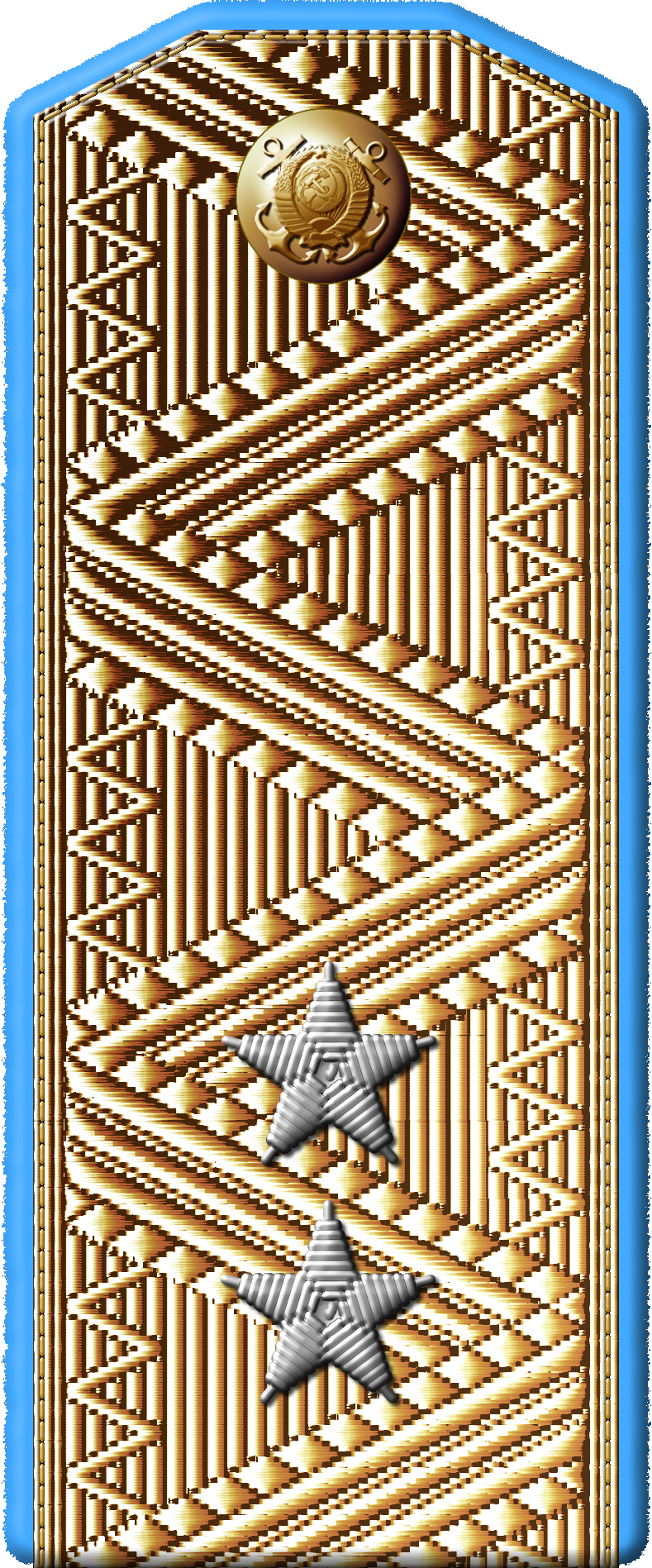
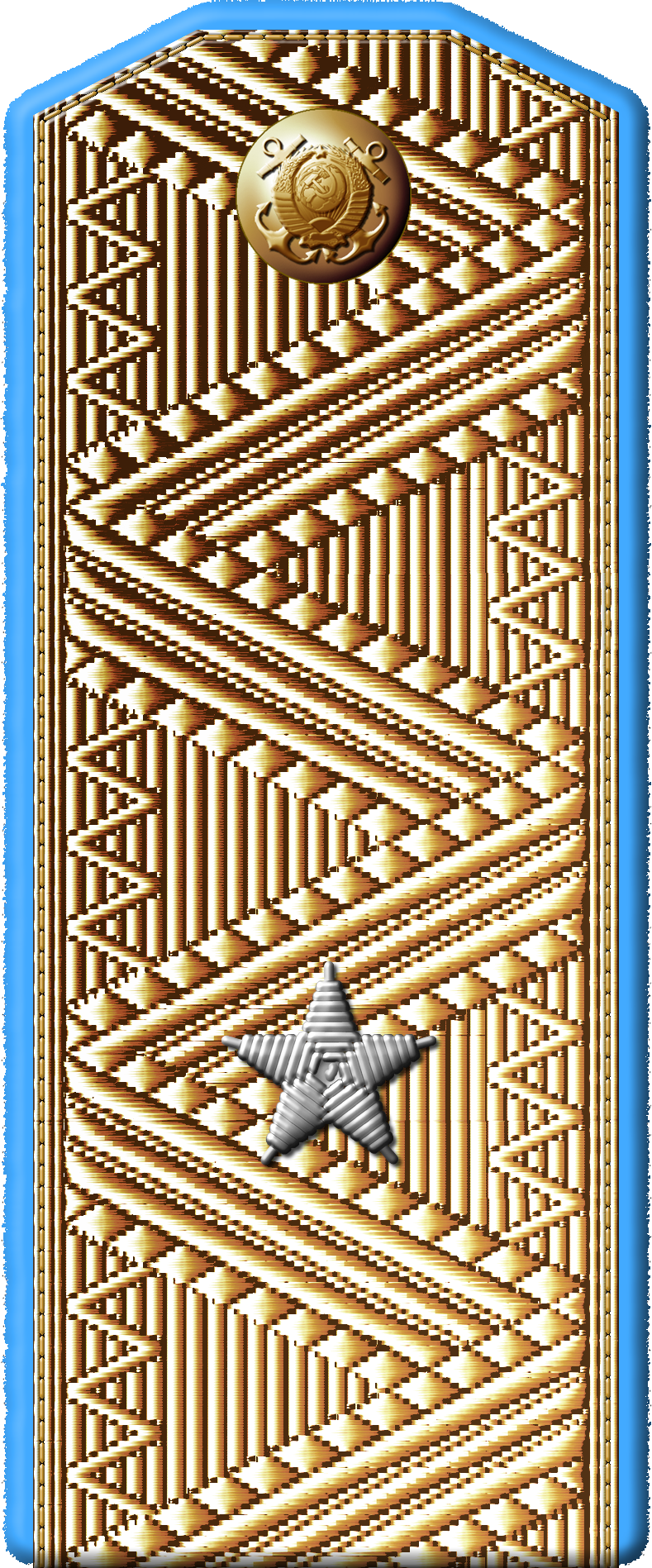
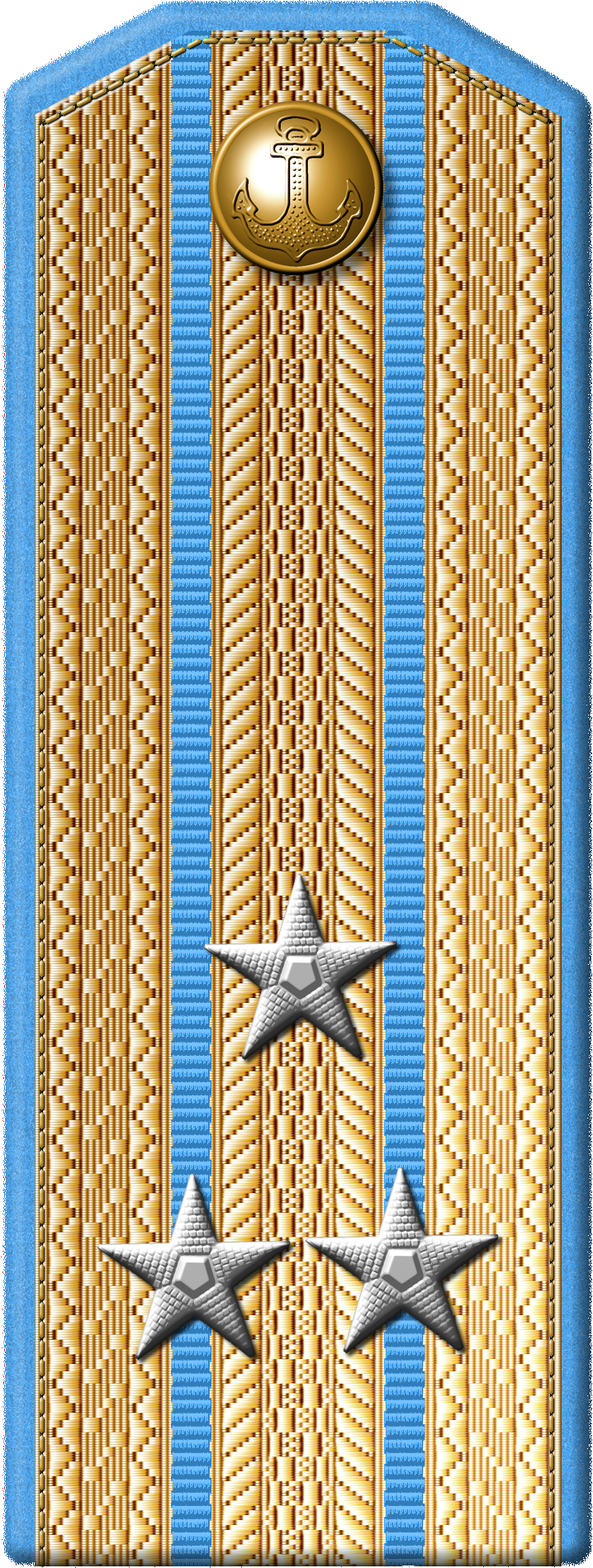
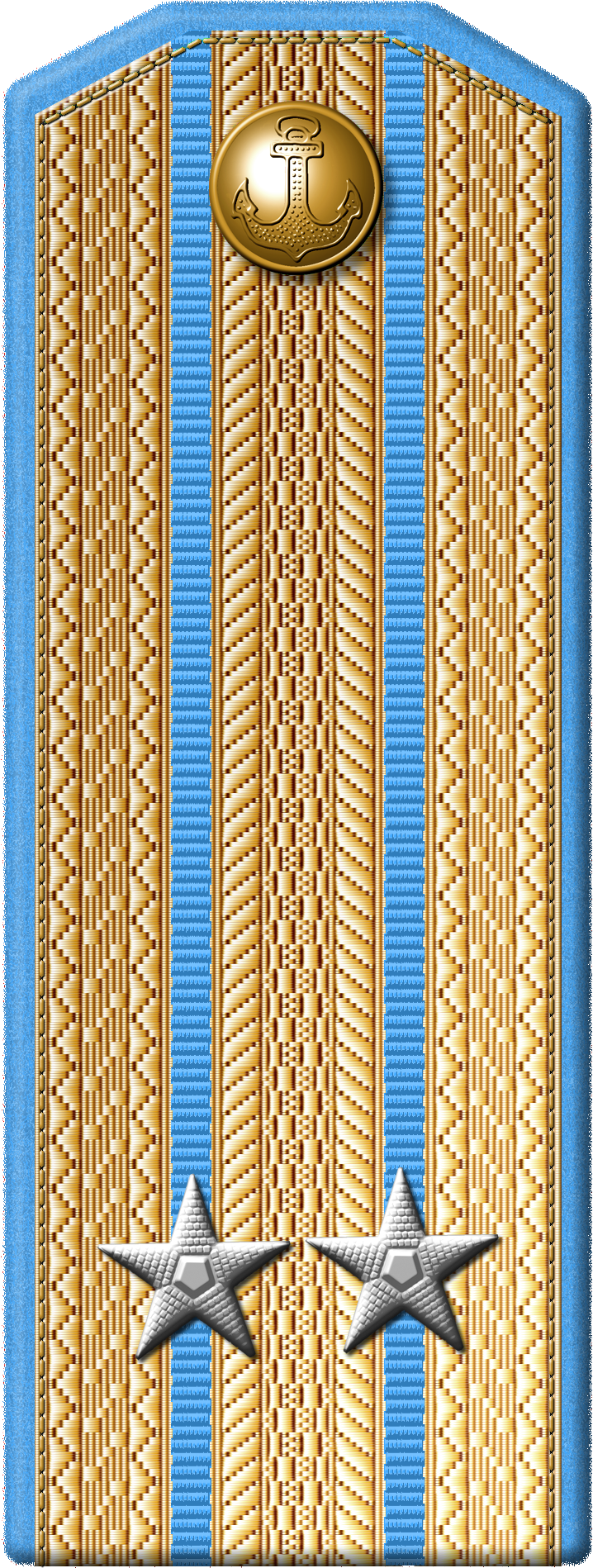
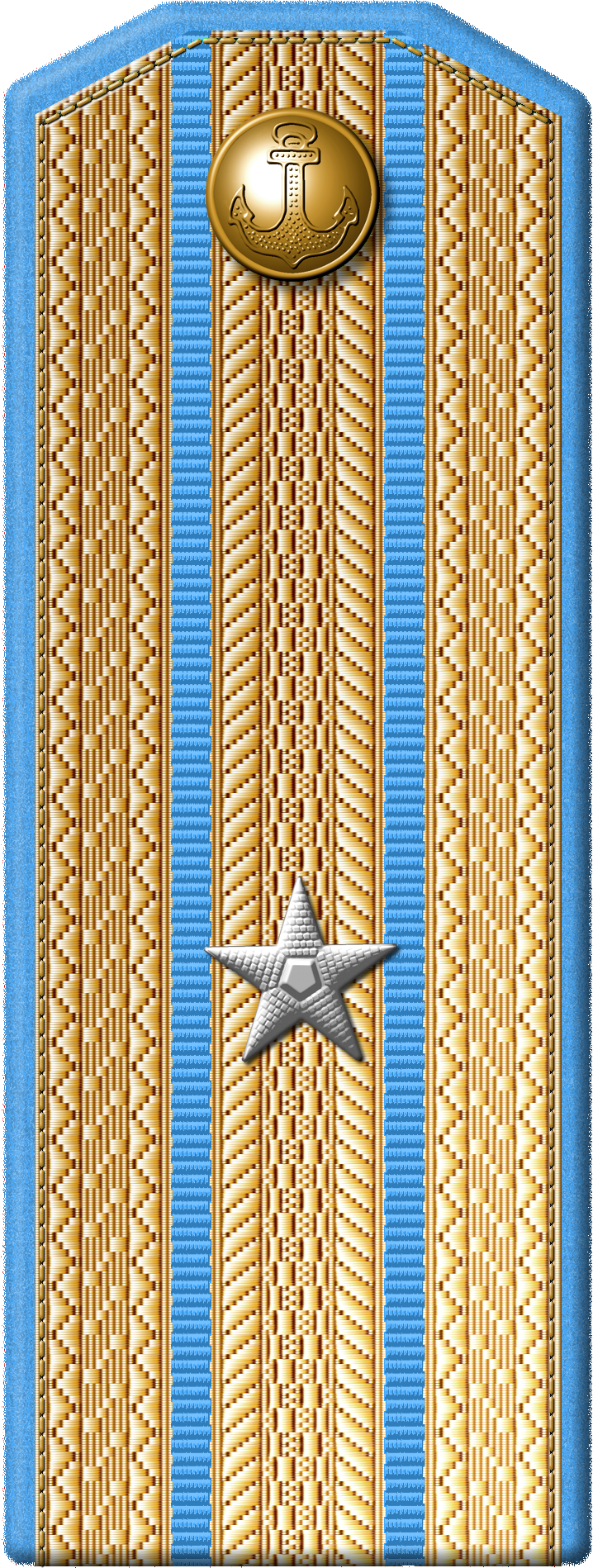
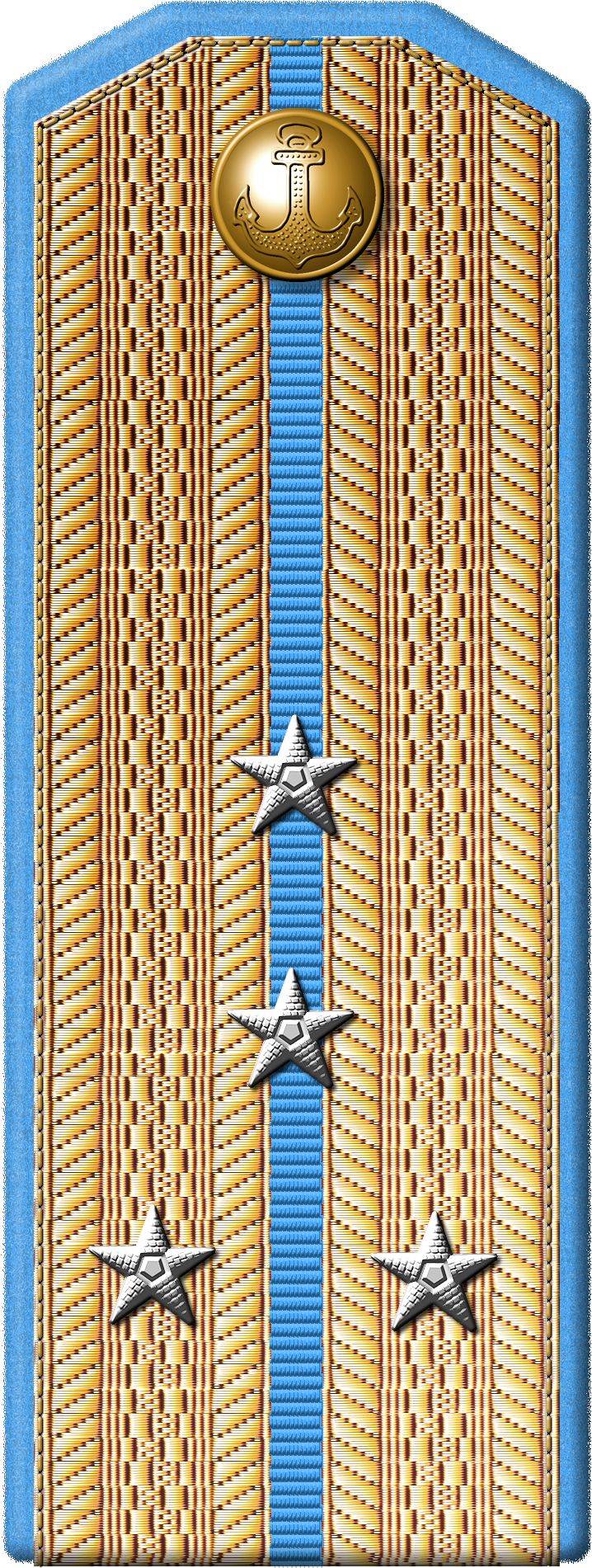
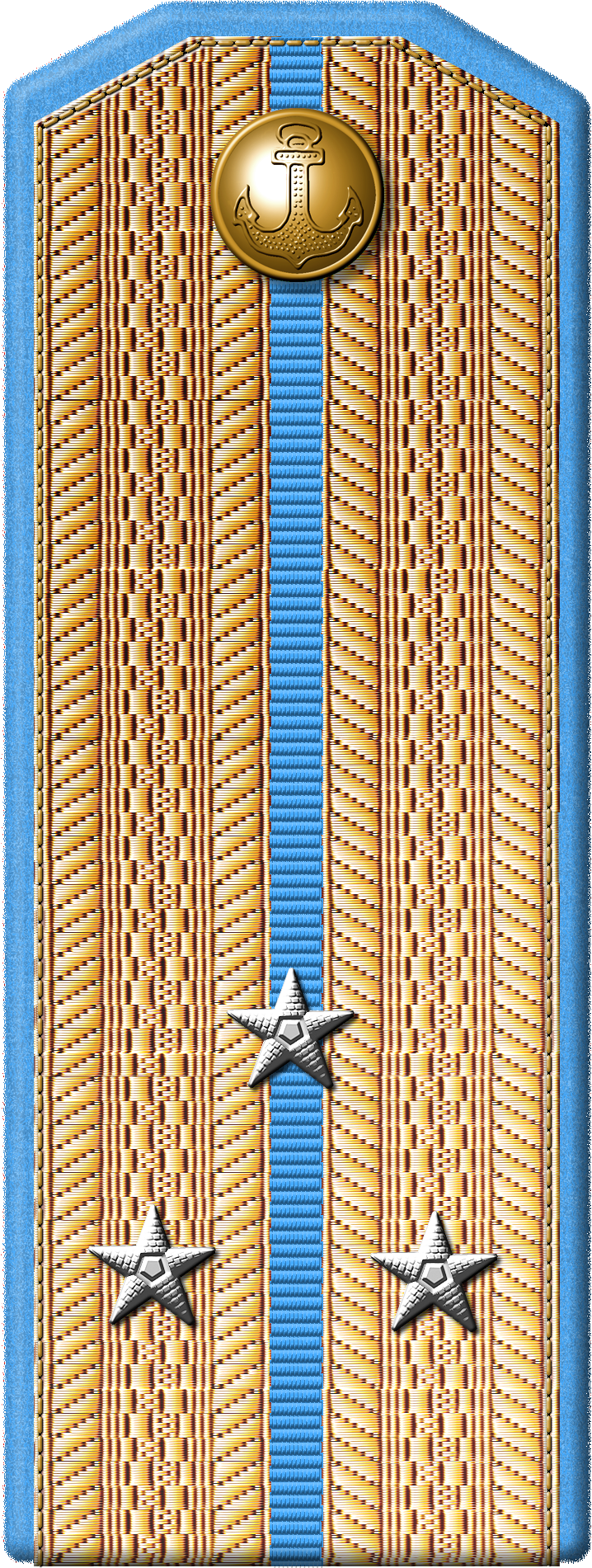
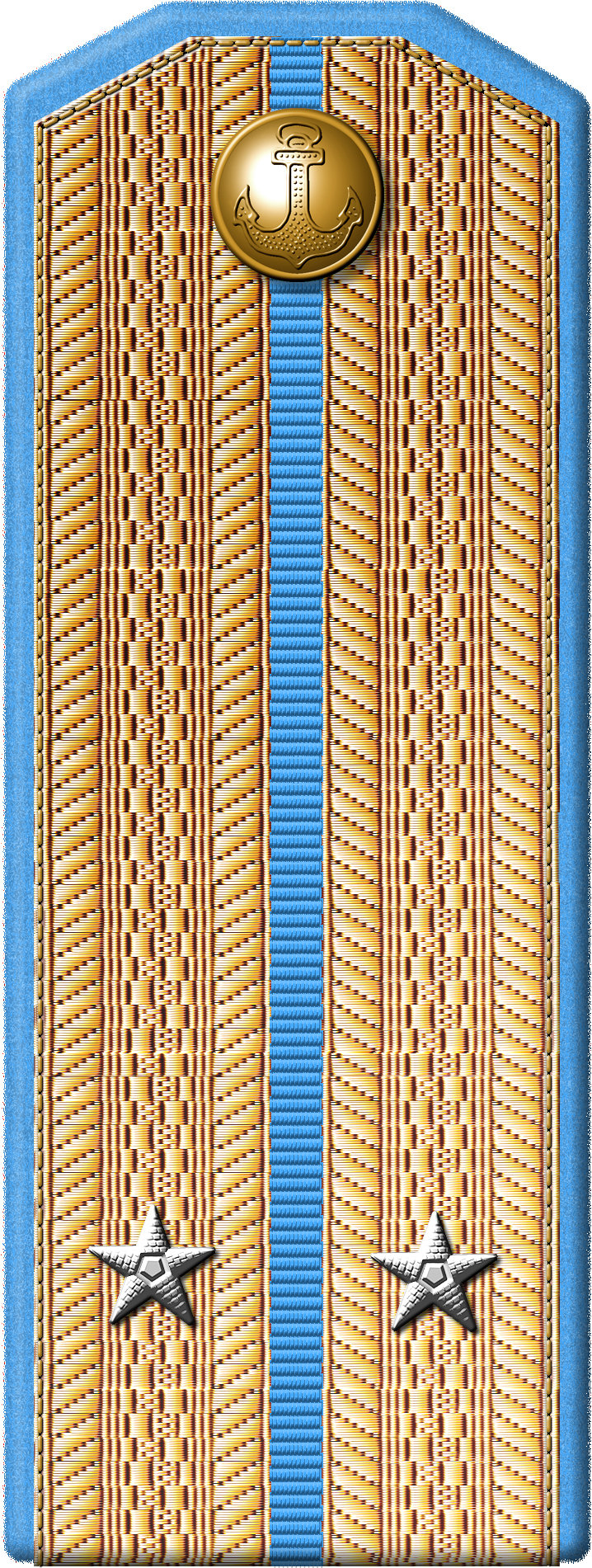
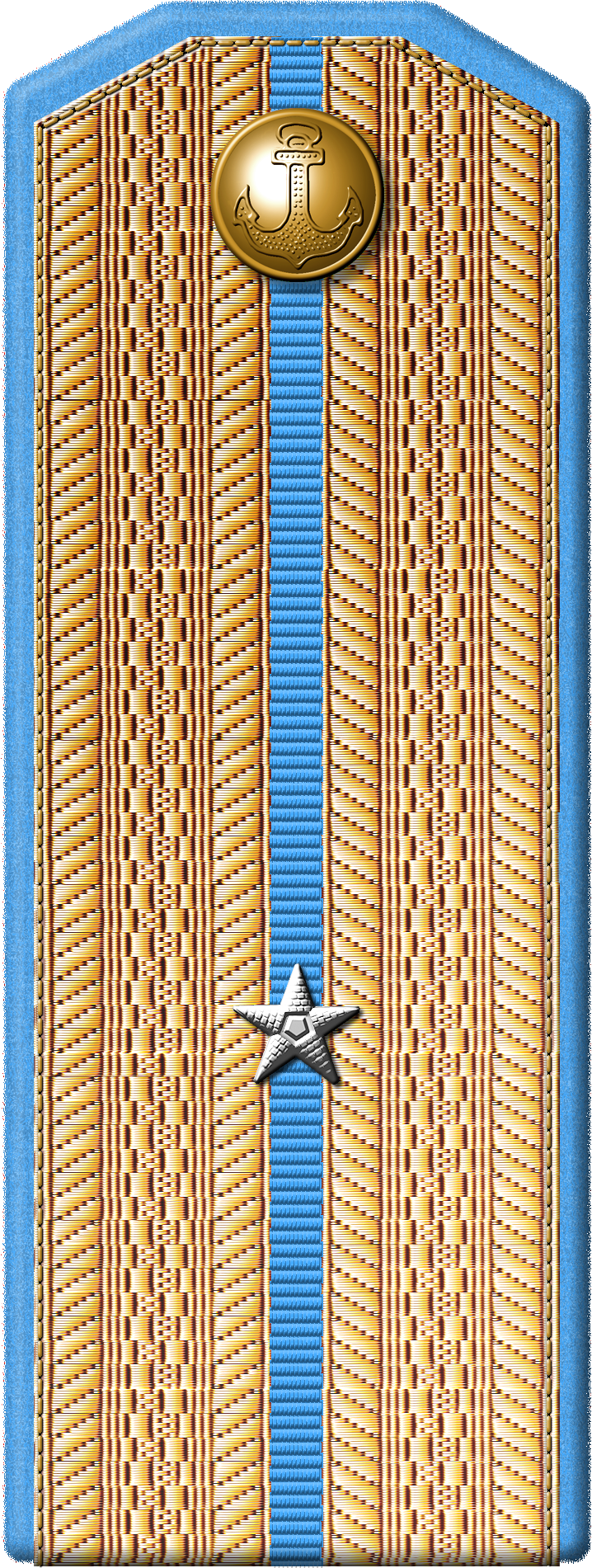
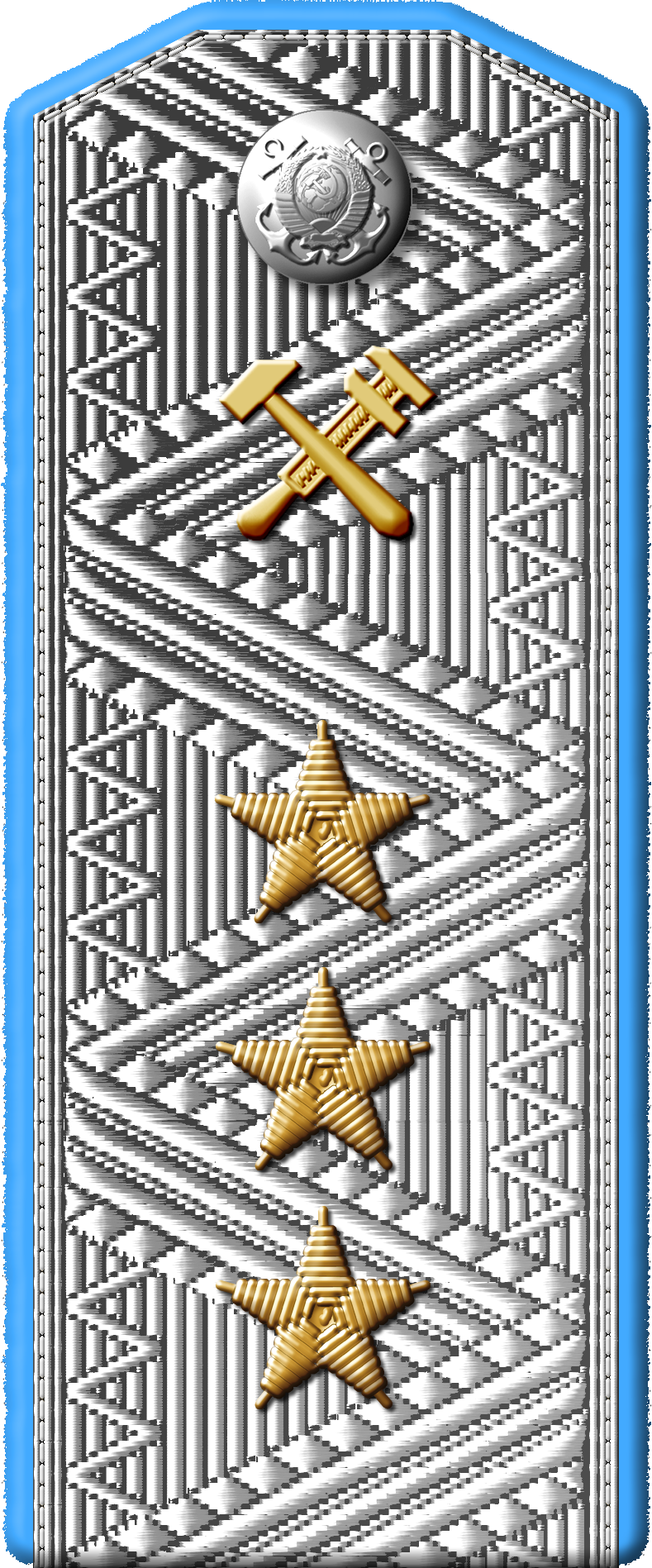
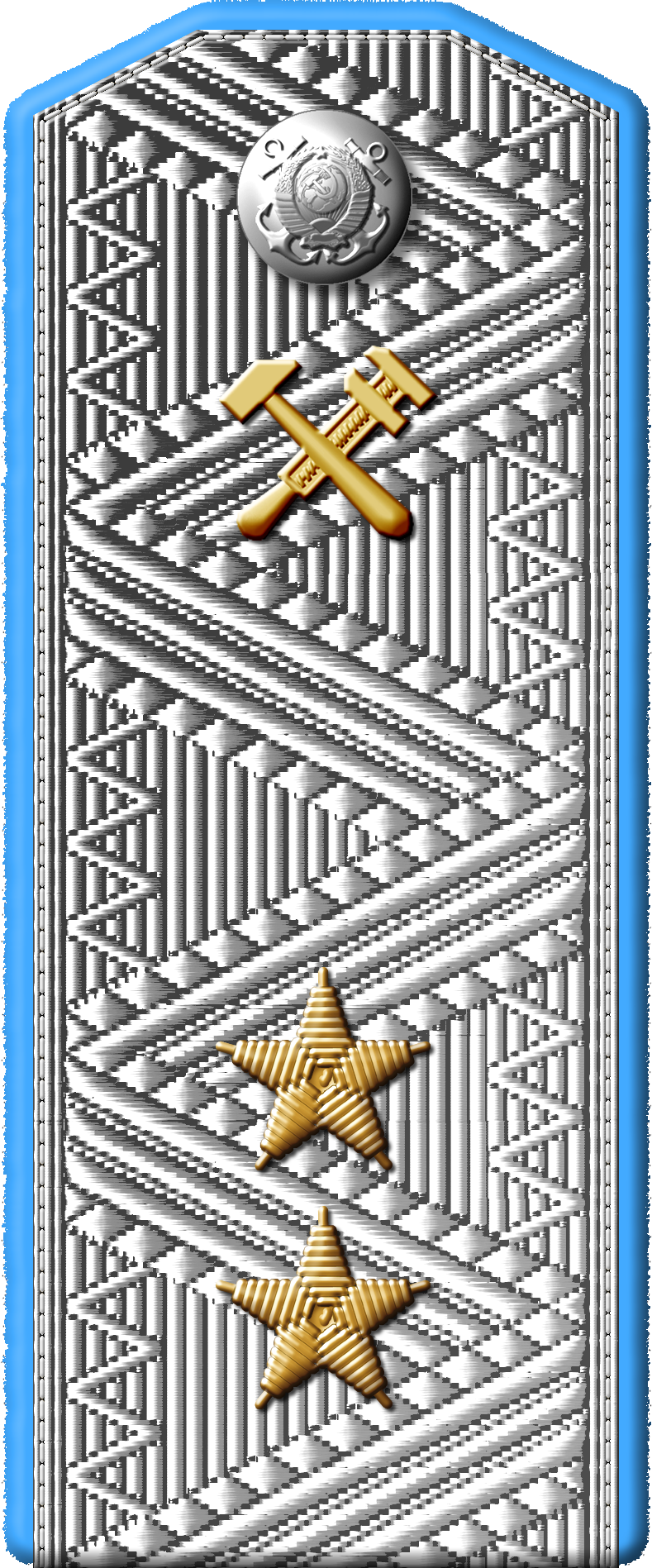
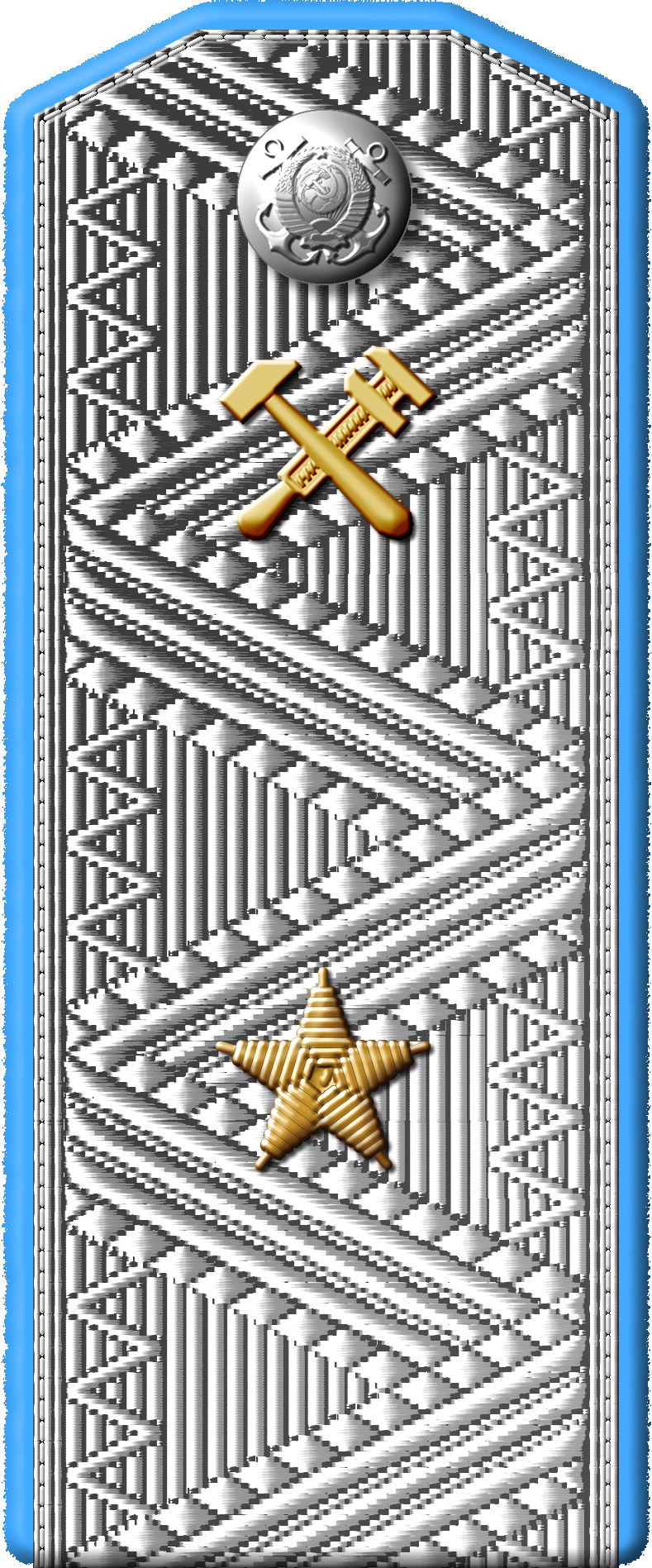
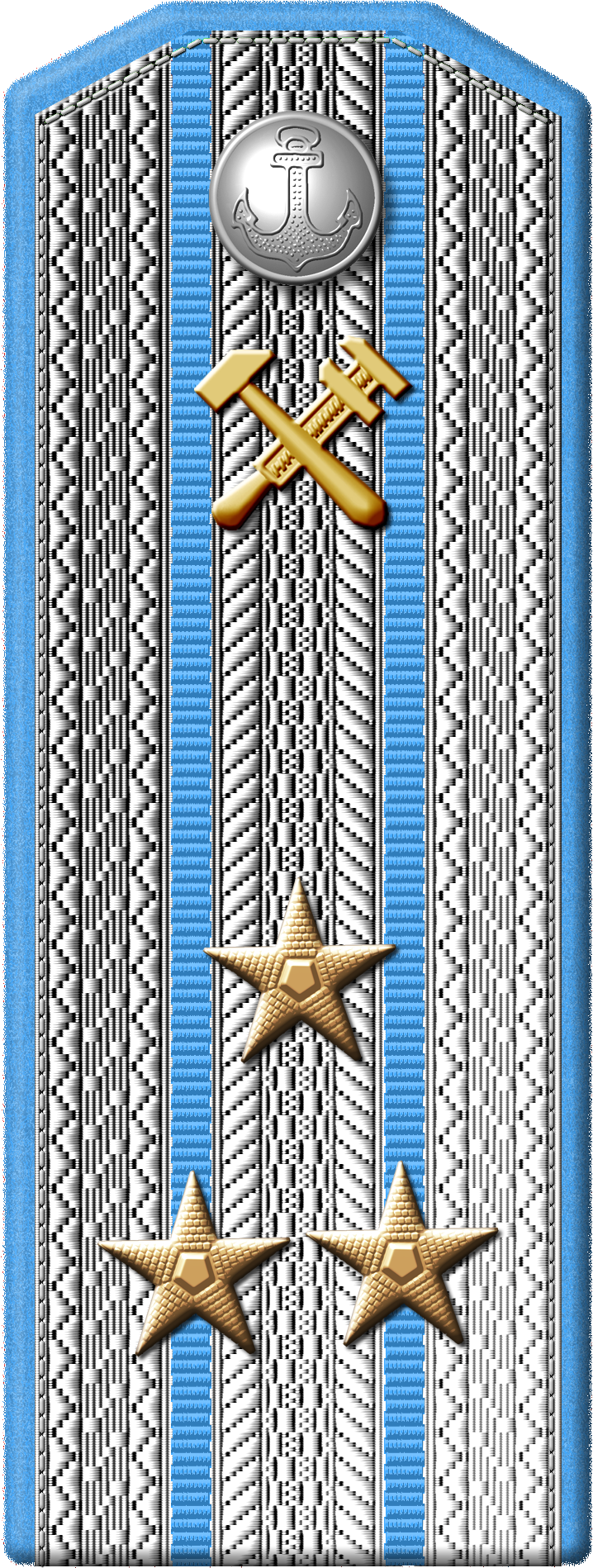
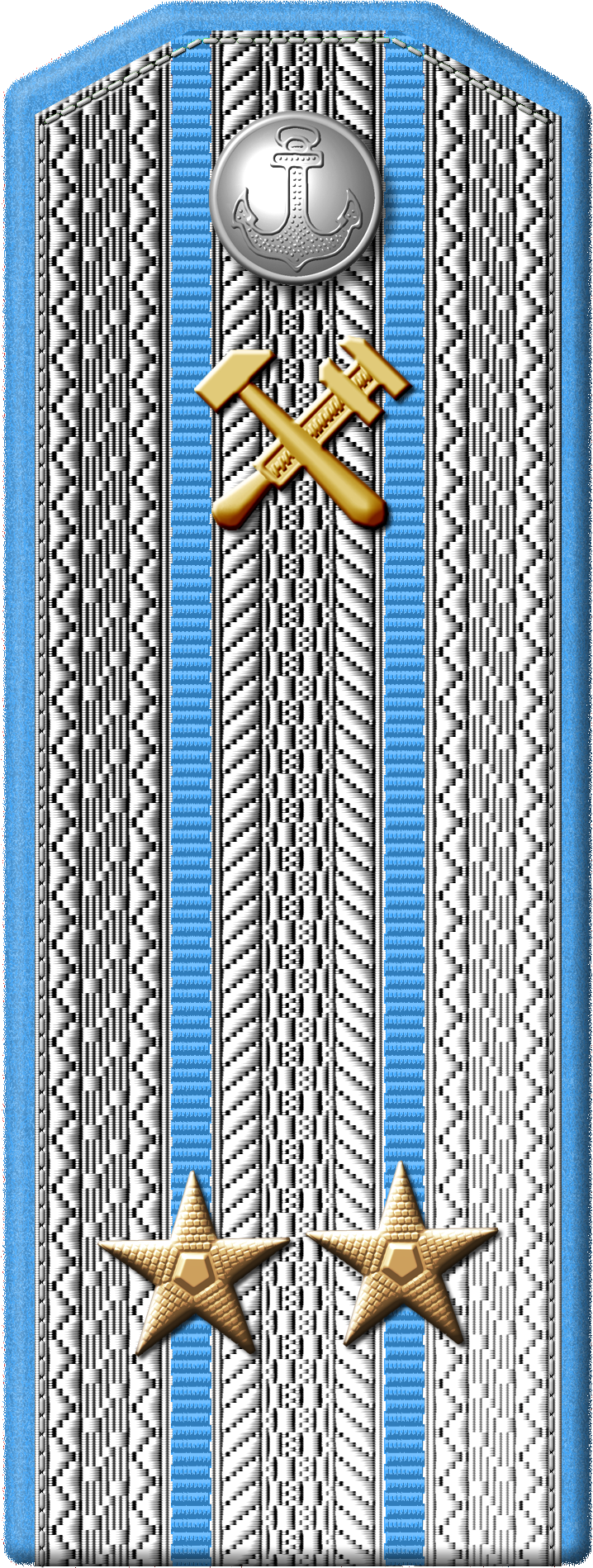
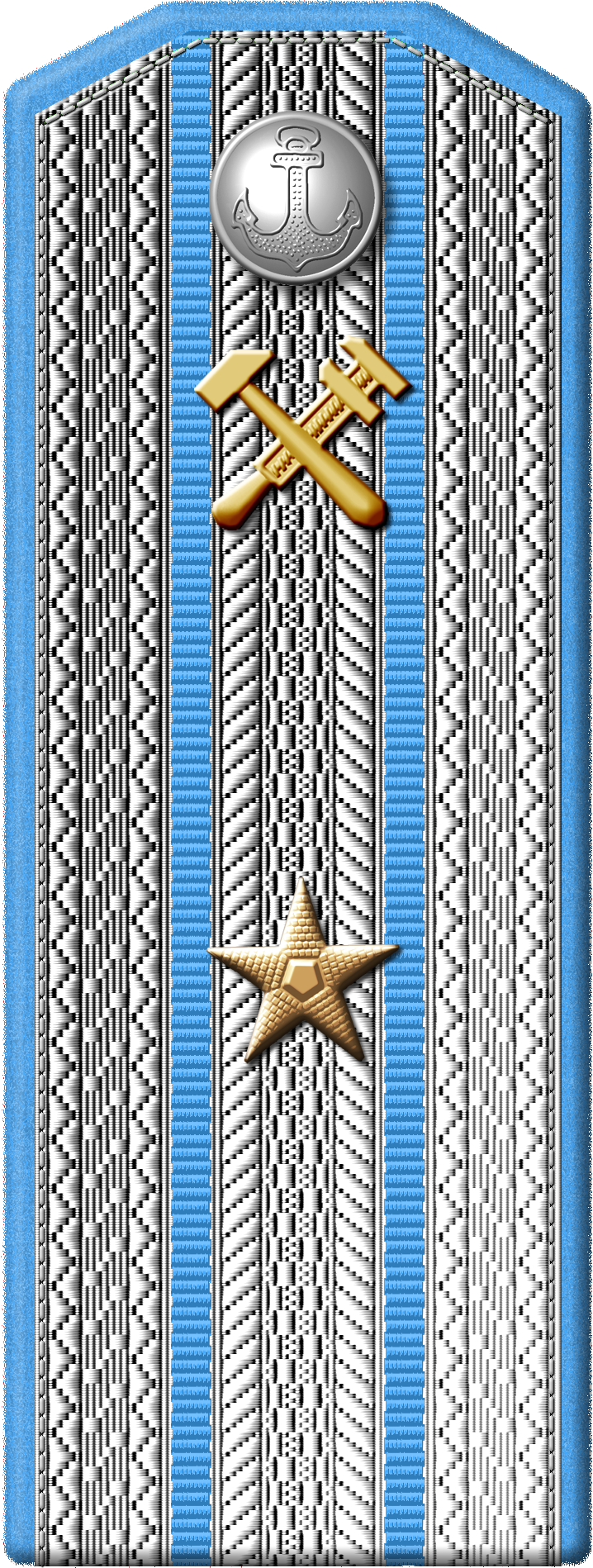
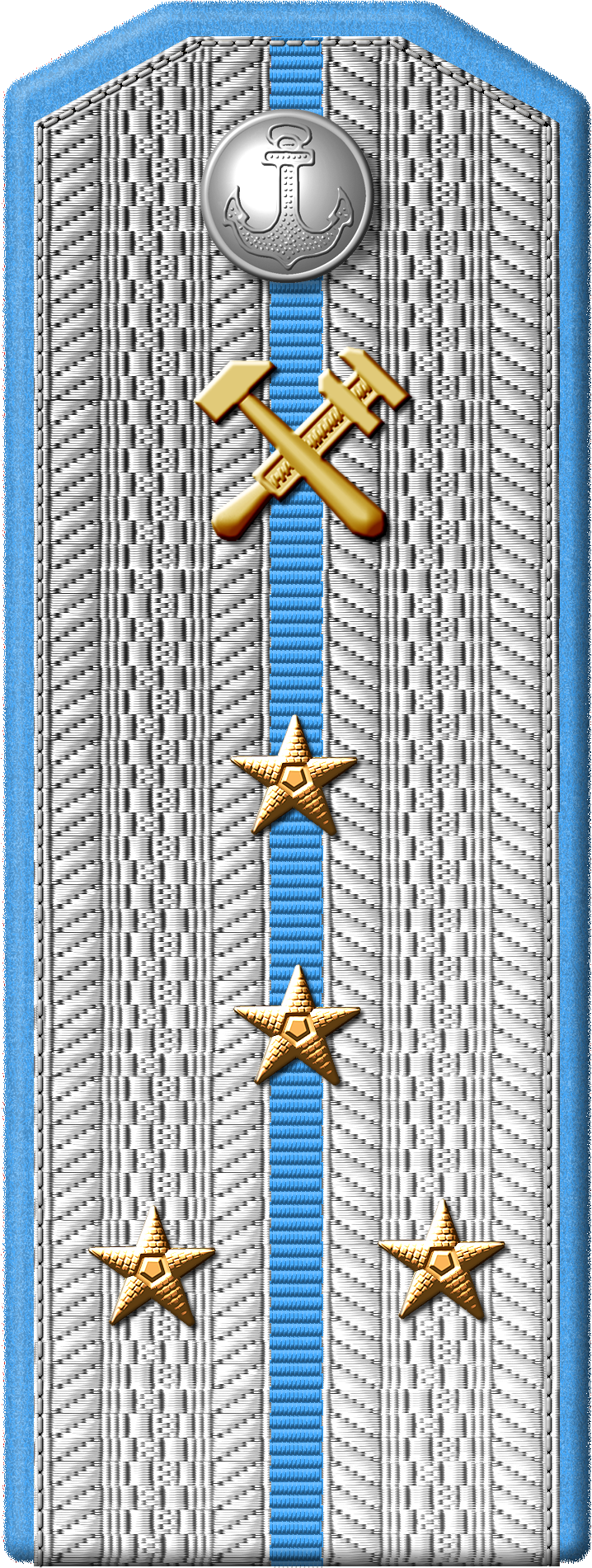
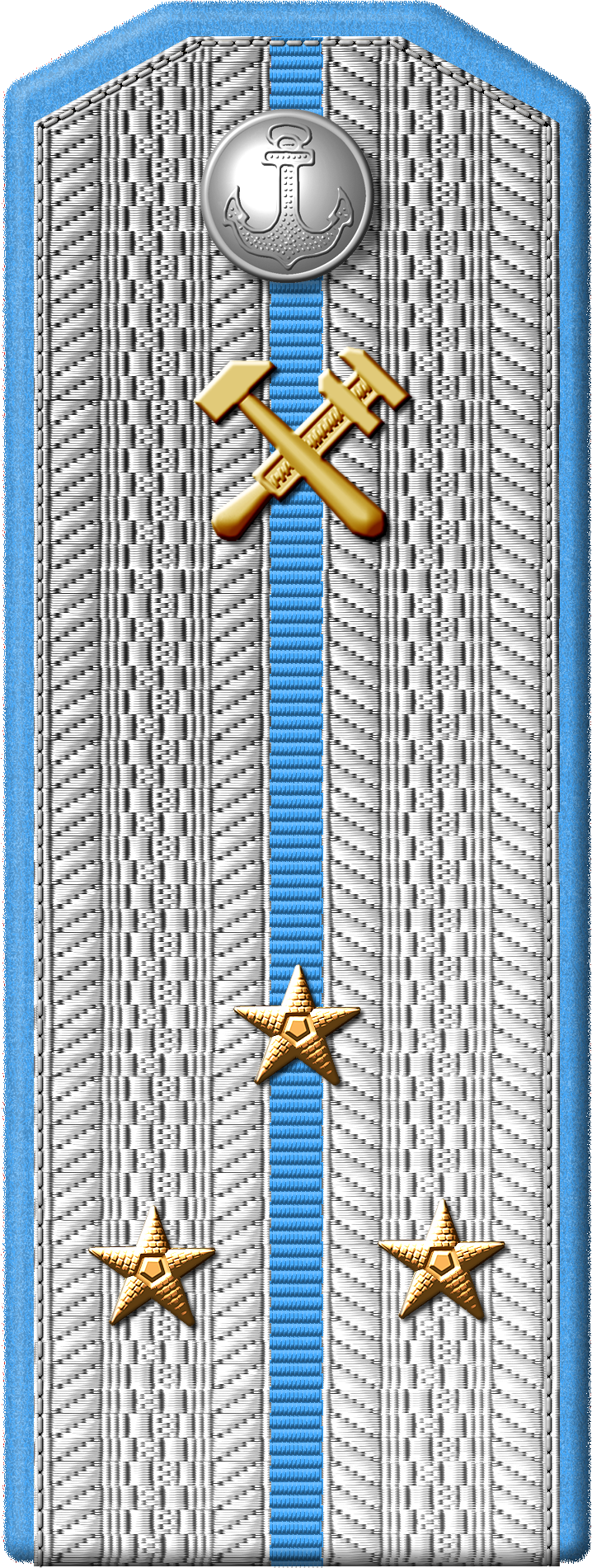
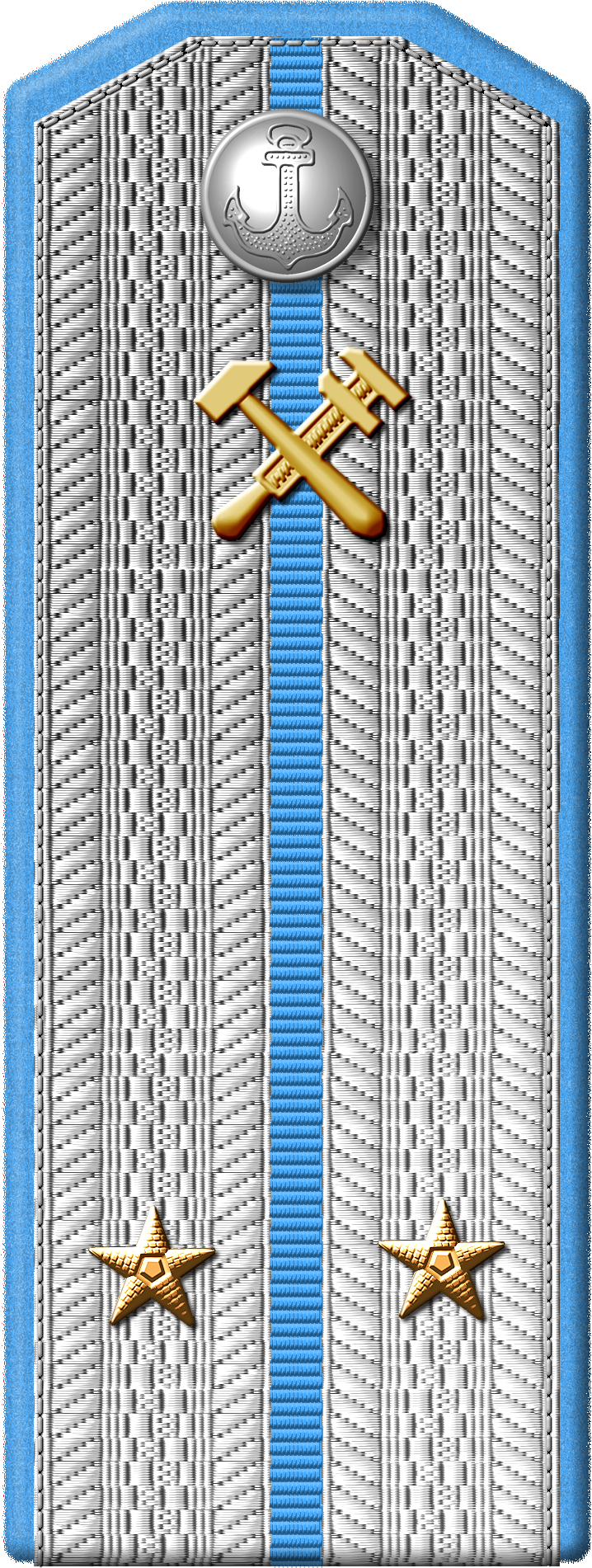
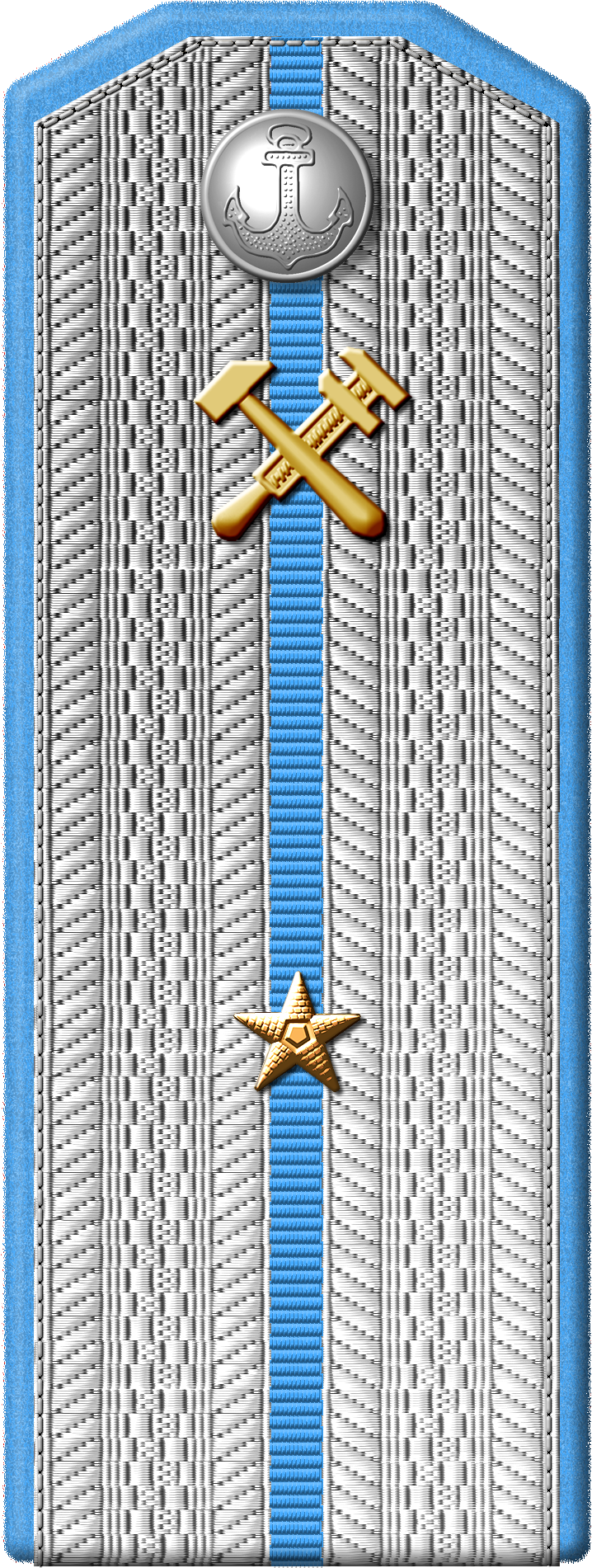
General officers			Officers & commanders							Designation
Shoulder strap to service uniform (Coastal Services, incl. Naval Infantry and Coastal Defense Artillery)
Shoulder strap to service uniform (Coastal Engineers)
Shoulder strap to service uniform (Naval Aviation)
Shoulder strap to service uniform (Naval Aviation engineers and technical staff)
Rank designation	Colonel general (Генерал-полковник)	Lieutenant general (Генерал-лейтенант)	Major general (Генерал-майор)	Colonel (Полковник)	Lieutenant colonel (Подполковник)	Major (Майор)	Captain (Капитан)	Senior lieutenant (Старший лейтенант)	Lieutenant (Лейтенант)	Junior lieutenant (Младший лейтенант)
Engineers rank designation	Colonel general (Генерал-полковник)	Lieutenant general (Генерал-лейтенант)	Major general (Генерал-майор)	Engineer-Colonel (Инженер-Полковник)	Engineer-Lieutenant colonel (Инженер-Подполковник)	Engineer Major (Инженер-Майор)	Engineer Captain (Инженер-капитан)	Senior Technician Lieutenant (Старший техник-лейтенант)	Technician Lieutenant (Техник-лейтенант)	Junior Technician Lieutenant (Младший техник-лейтенант)

==== Other ranks ====
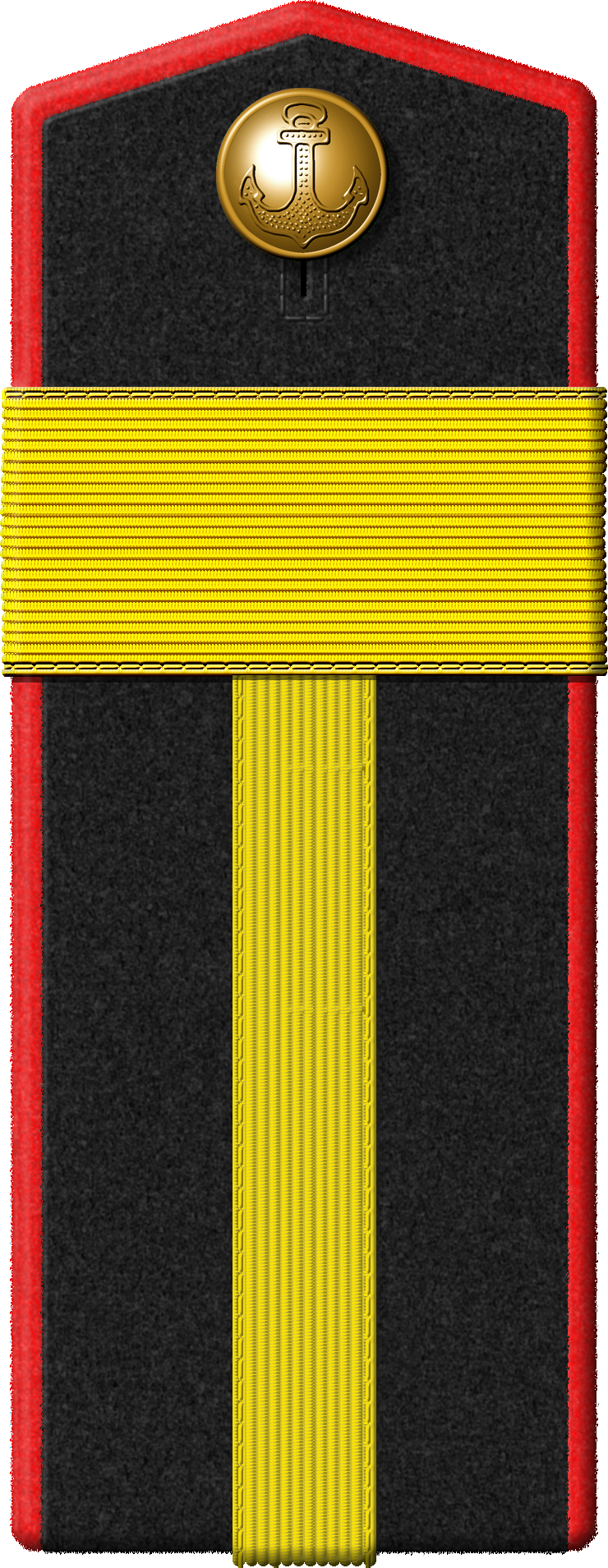
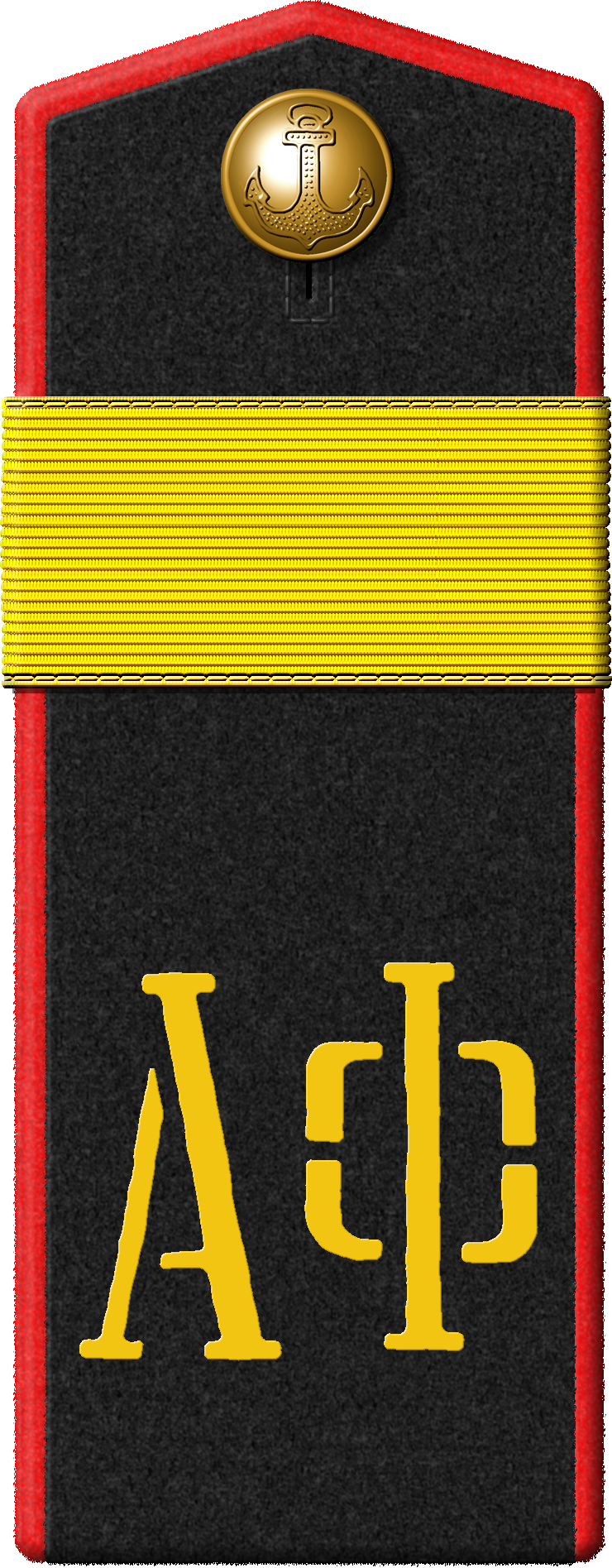
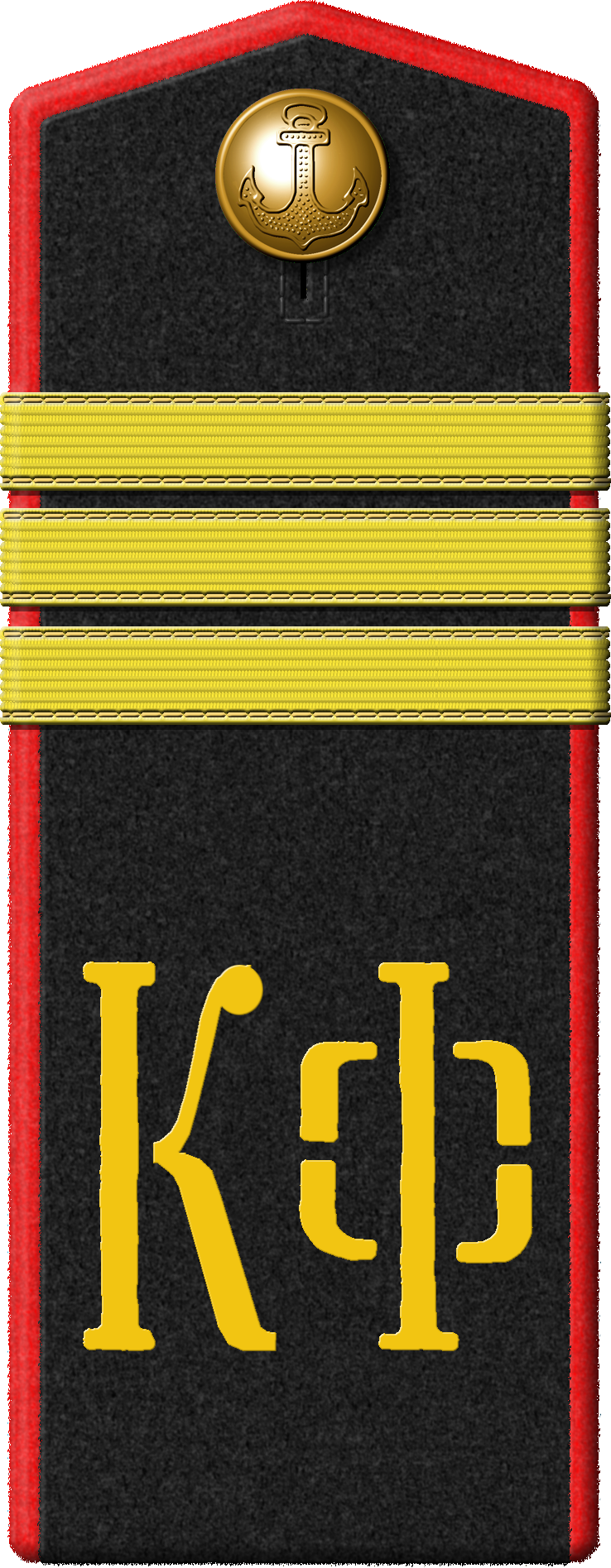
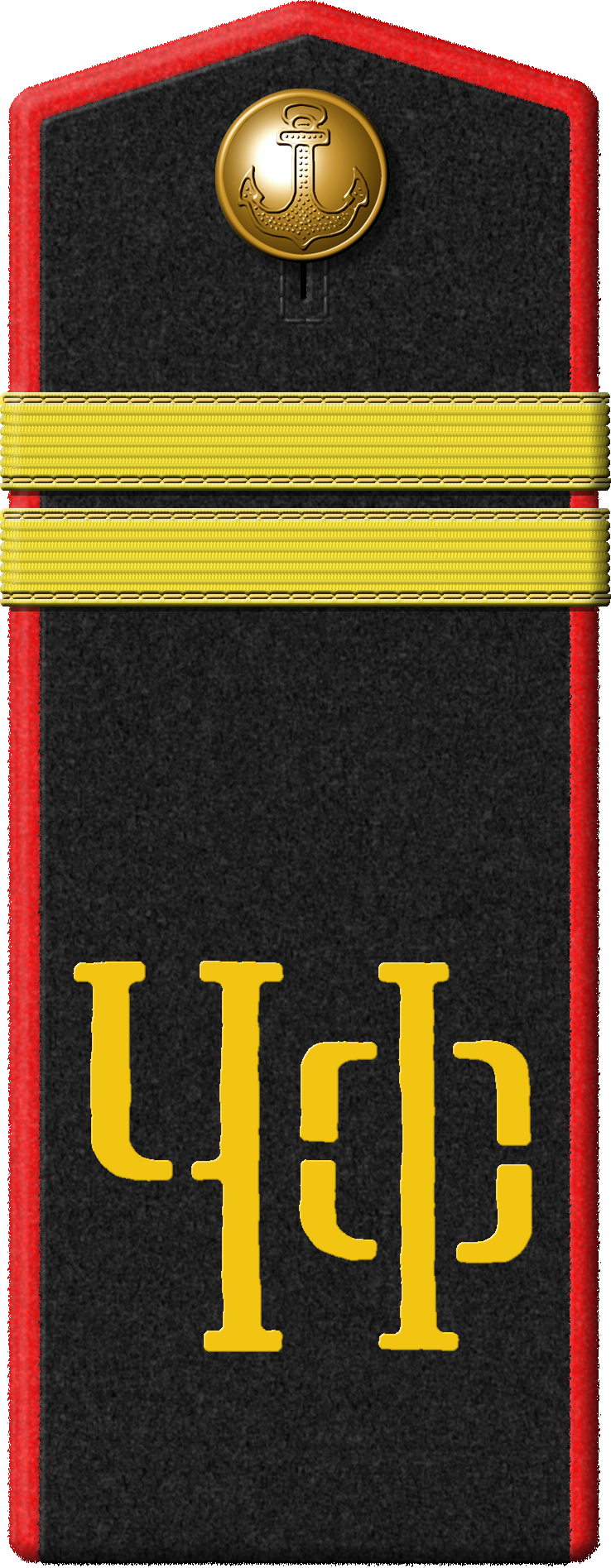
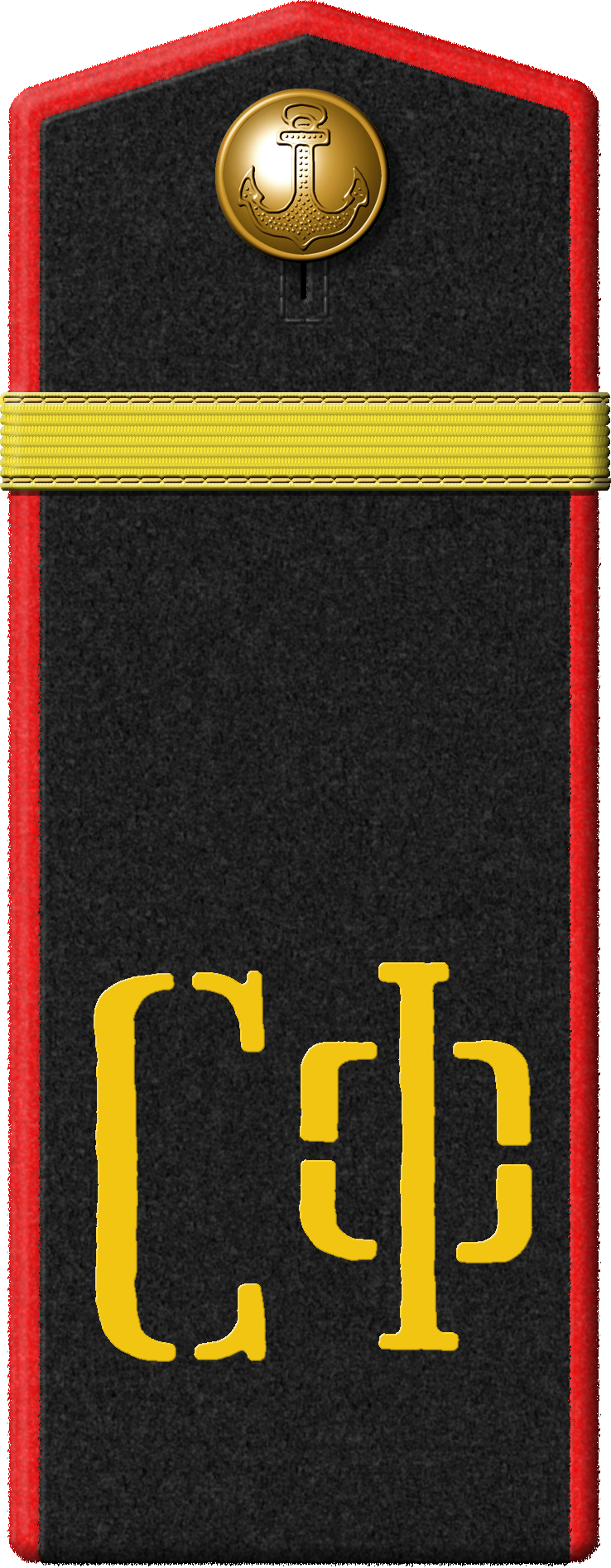
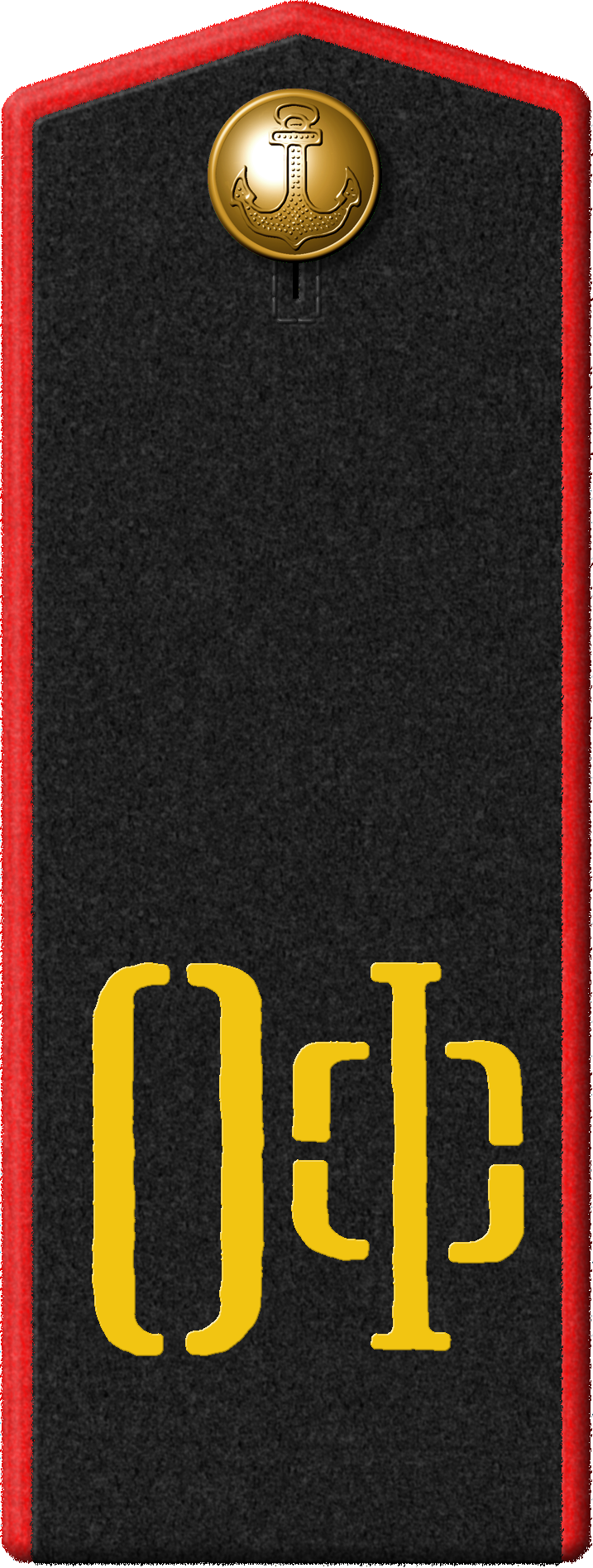
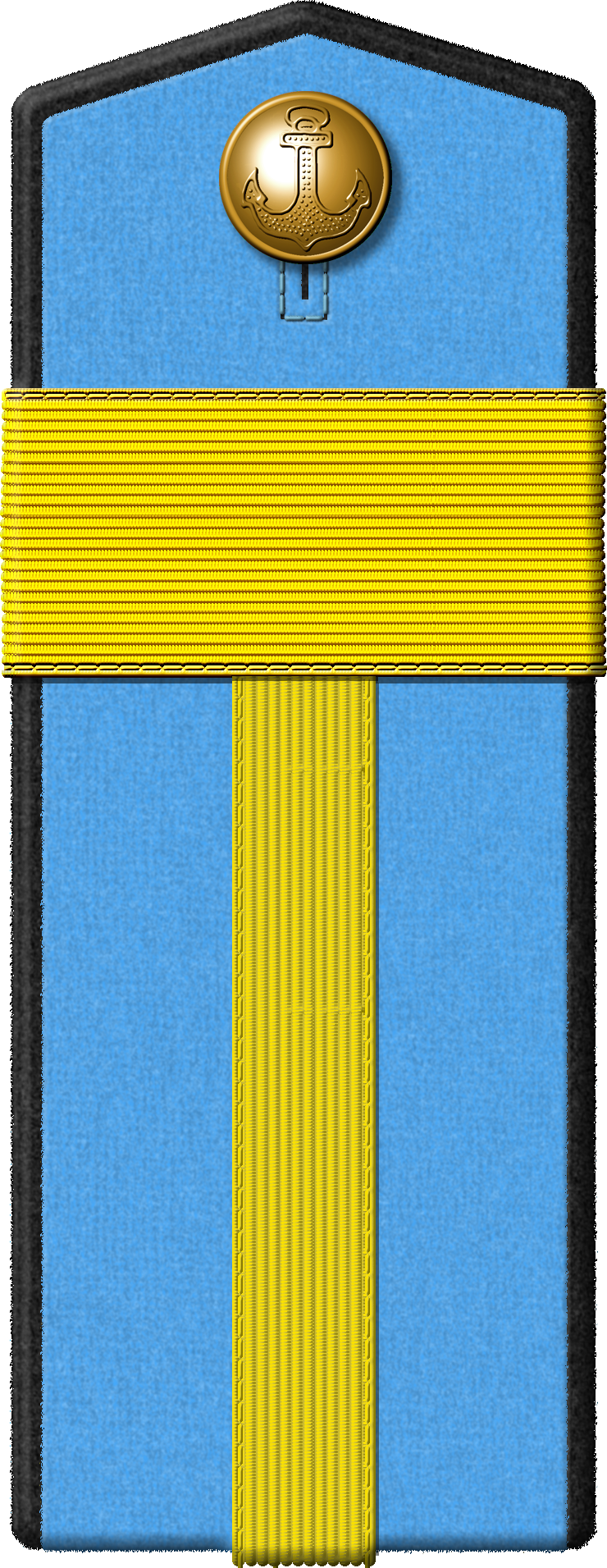
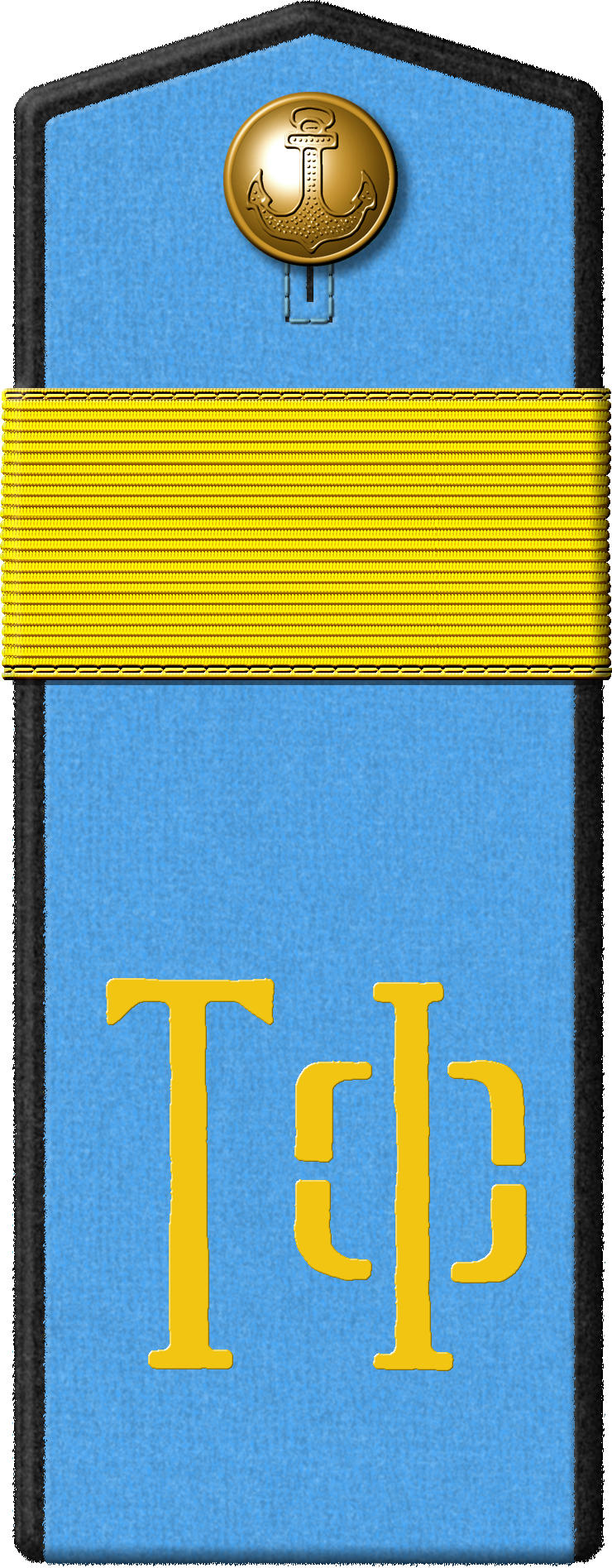
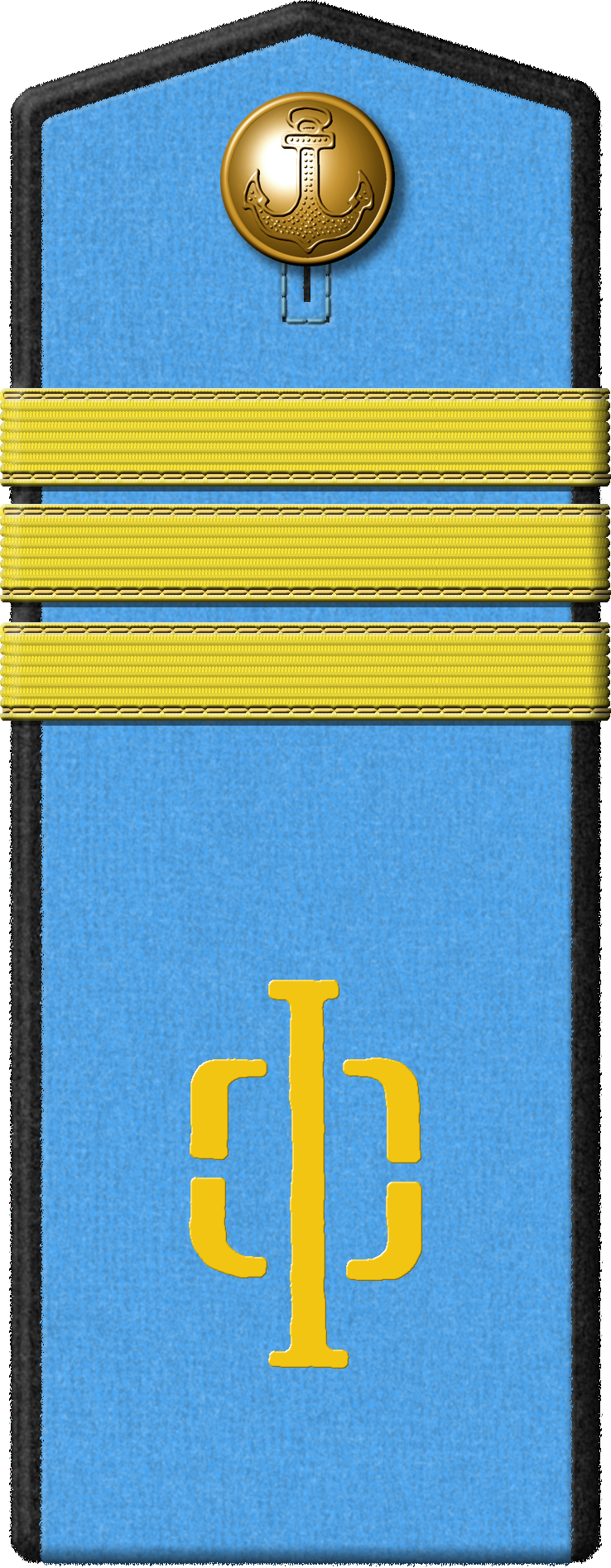
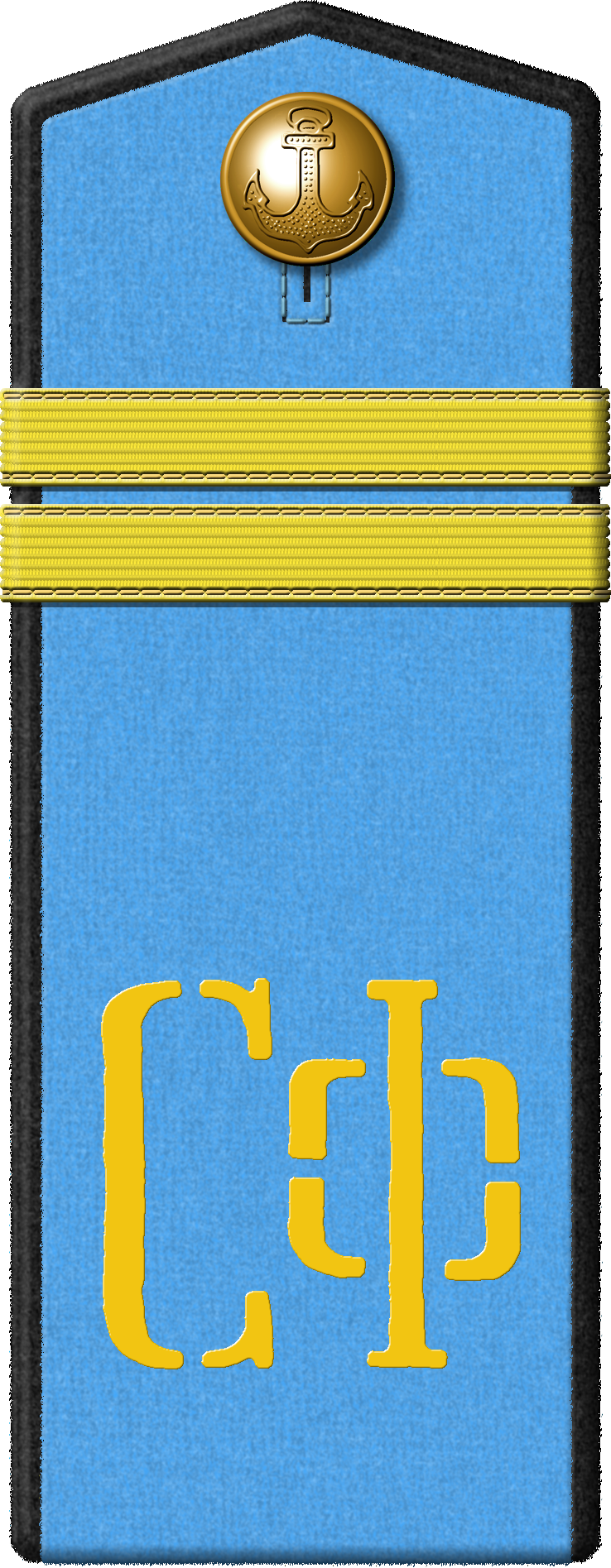
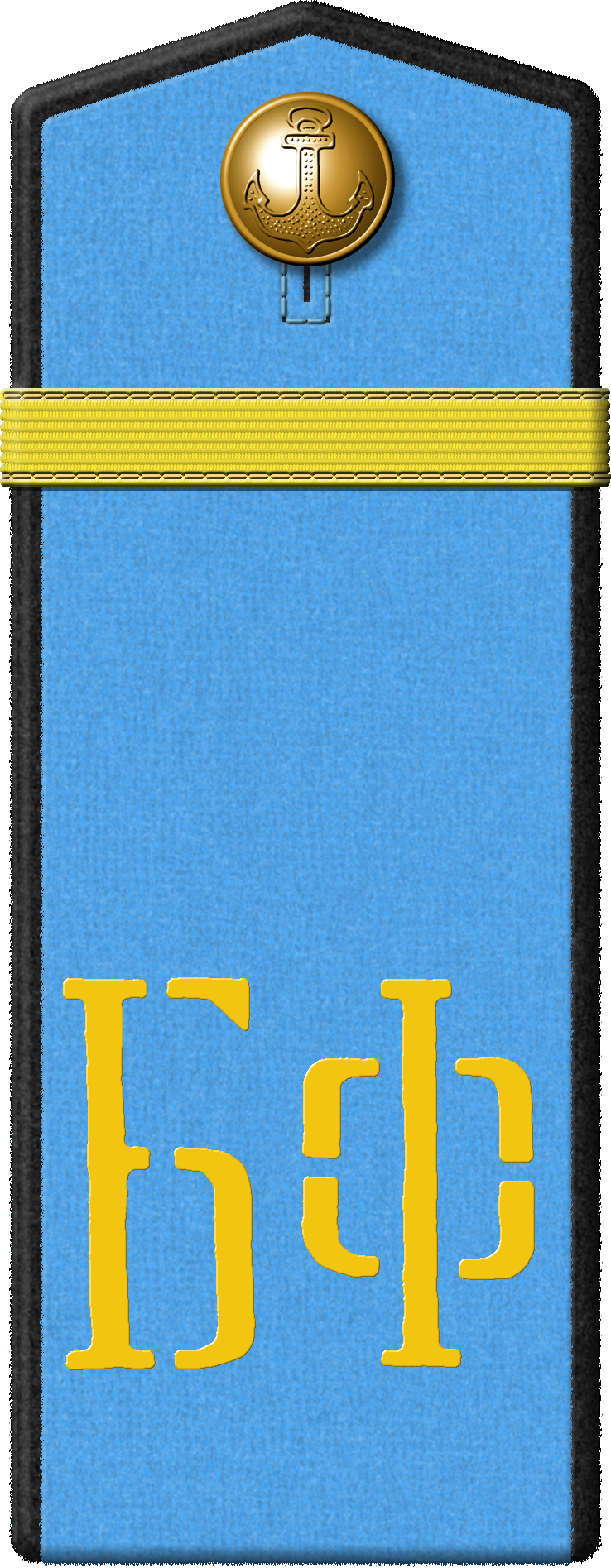
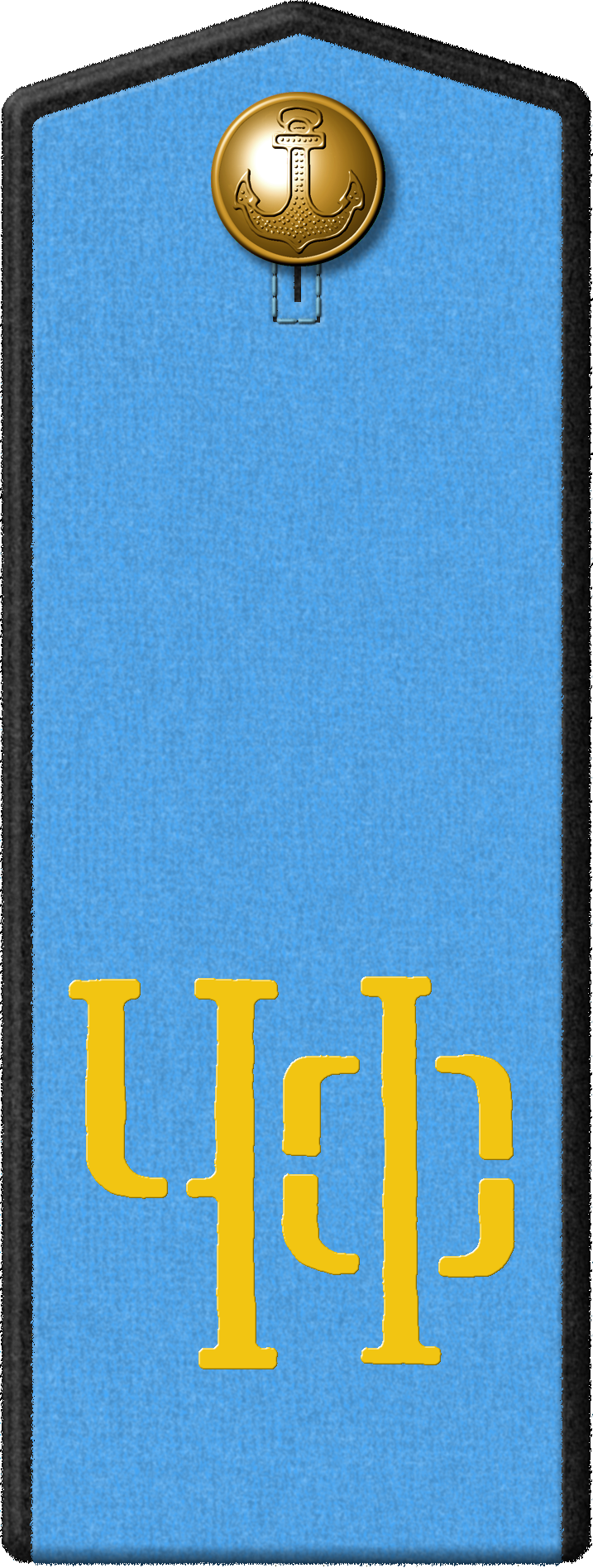
Shoulder straps to service uniform basic	Enlisted men and non-commissioned officers of ground services (Coastal Services and Naval Aviation)
Shoulder board to service uniform (Personnel of coastal services)
Shoulder board to service uniform (Personnel of naval aviation)
Shoulder strap to service uniform (Personnel of coastal services)						General Navy
Shoulder strap to service uniform (Personnel of naval aviation)						Caspian Flotilla Air Service
Rank designation	Starshina	Staff Sergeant	Sergeant	Junior Sergeant	Senior seaman	Seaman

== See also ==
- History of Russian military ranks
- Ranks and insignia of the Imperial Russian Armed Forces
- Military ranks of the Soviet Union (1918–1935)
- Military ranks of the Soviet Union (1935–1940)
- Military ranks of the Soviet Union (1940–1943)
- Military ranks of the Soviet Union (1955–1991)
- Ranks and insignia of the Russian Federation's armed forces 1994–2010
